= History of Białystok =

This is a sub-article to Białystok

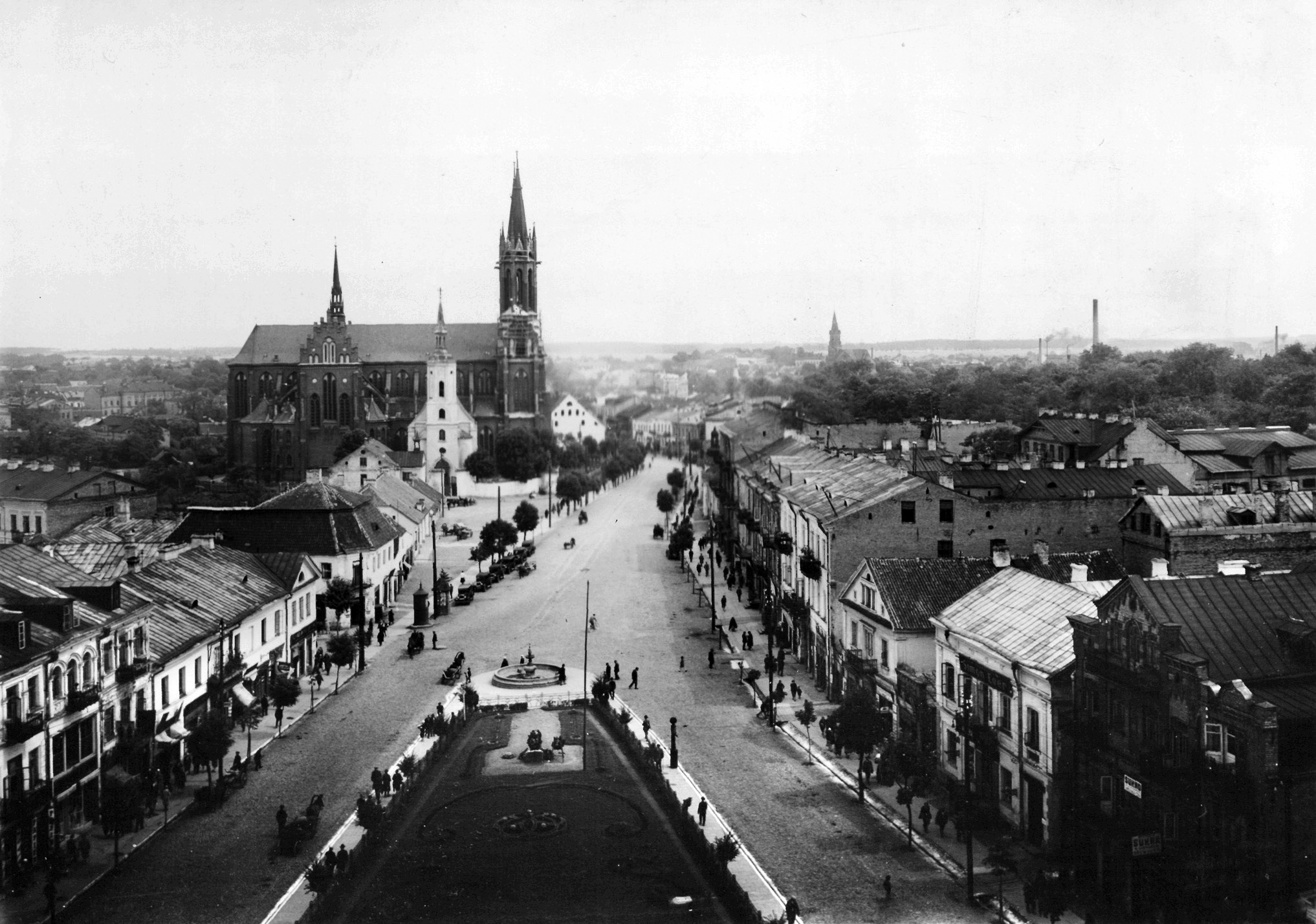
Białystok in the interbellum

The history of Białystok spans for over five centuries, during which time the fate of the city has passed between various political and economic forces.

From surviving documentation is it known that around 1437, a representative of the family Raczków, Jakub Tabutowicz with the coat of arms of Łabędź, received from Michael Žygimantaitis son of Sigismund Kęstutaitis, Duke of Lithuania, a wilderness area located along the river Biała that marked the beginning of Białystok as a settlement. Białystok administratively was part of the Podlaskie Voivodeship, after 1569 also part of the Lesser Poland Province of the Crown of the Kingdom of Poland.

During the years 1617–1626, the first brick church and a beautiful castle, on a rectangular plan with two floors, in the Gothic-Renaissance style, was built by Job Bretfus. Extension of the castle continued by Krzysztof Wiesiołowski, since 1635 Grand Marshal of Lithuania and the owner of several administrative and royal and married Aleksandra Marianna Sobieska. In 1637 he died childless, thus Bialystok came under the management of his widow. After her death in 1645 the Wiesiołowskis estate, including Białystok, passed to the Commonwealth, to maintain Tykocin Castle. In the years 1645–1659 Bialystok was managed by governors of Tykocin. of a number of countries or occupying powers;, among them New East Prussia province, Belostoksky Uyezd of the Grodno Governorate, Bialystok-Grodno District, Białystok Voivodeship, Belastok Voblast, Bezirk Białystok, Białystok Voivodeship (1945–1975) After the 1975 administrative reorganization of the People's Republic of Poland, the city was the capital of the smaller Białystok Voivodeship which lasted until 1998, Białystok Voivodeship (1975–1998) and Podlaskie Voivodeship.

== Prehistory and protohistory ==
Archaeological discoveries show that the first people settled on the territory of the present Białystok already in the Stone Age. Tombs of ancient settlers found in the district Pieczurki, Dojlidy and in some other parts of the city.

In the early Iron Age a mix of Prussians, Yotvingians and population Wielbark culture, after which the remaining kurgan – probably the tombs of the chiefs in the area in the village Rostołty.

Since then, the Białystok area has been at the crossroads of cultures. Trade routes linking the Baltic to the Black Sea favored the development of settlements with Yotvingia-Ruthenian-Polish cultural characteristics.

== Middle Ages ==
From surviving documentation we know that around 1437, a representative of the family Raczków, Jakub Tabutowicz with the coat of arms of Łabędź, received from Michael Žygimantaitis son of Sigismund Kęstutaitis, Duke of Lithuania, wilderness areas located along the river called the Biała River.

Jakub Raczków divided the land between his four sons: Nicholas, John, Wenceslas and Jundziłła. Nicholas inherited the estate in 1462 in Bialystok and erected a mansion near the current location of the Branicki Palace. After the year 1479 Białystok took good son Nicholas, Nicholas is also known as Bachelor, because he studied at Cracow Academy. He was secretary to King Alexander Jagiellon and a member of the Privy council.

== Early modern era ==
=== Wiesiołowski Estate (1514–1661) ===
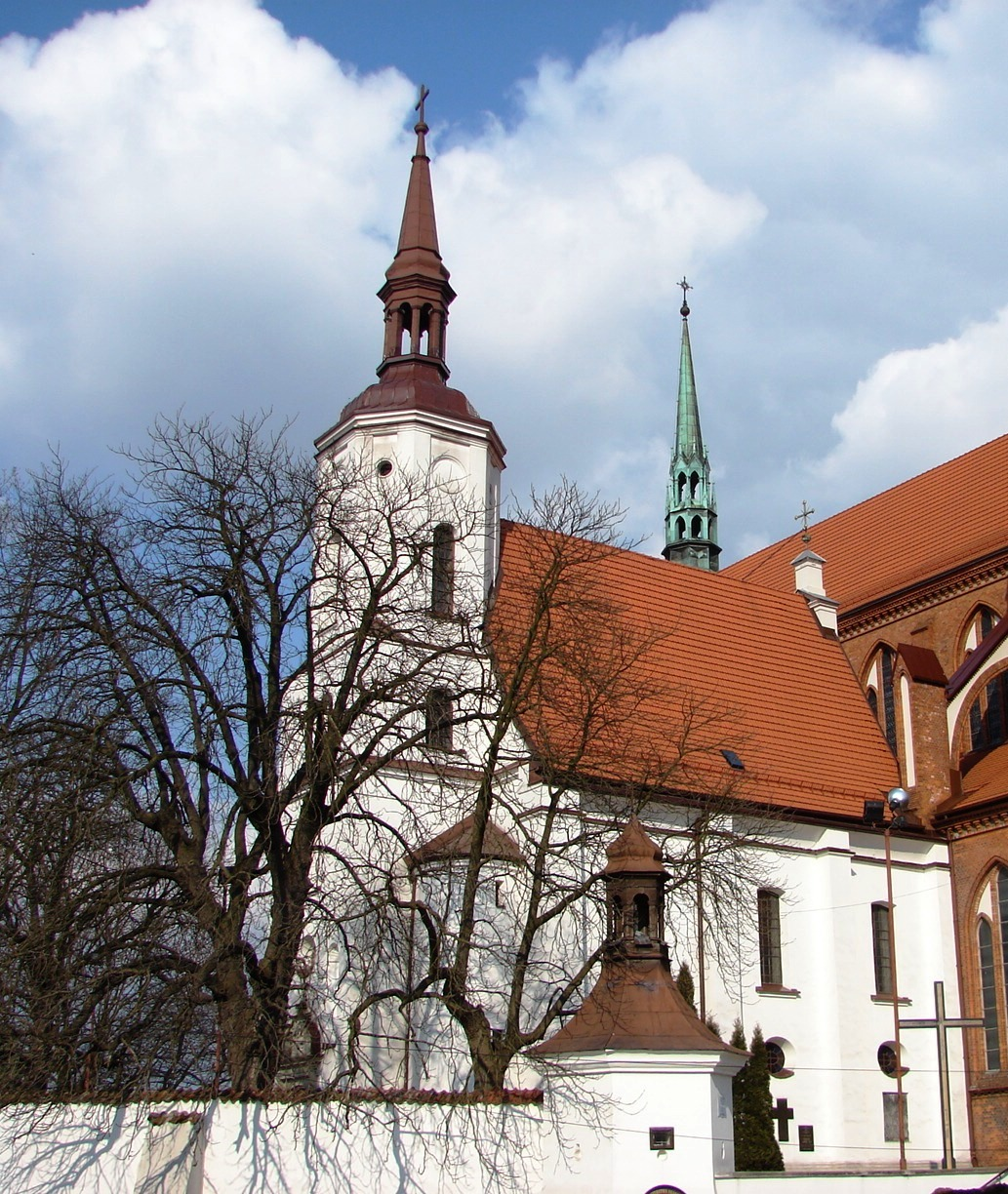
Renaissance old parish church

It is precisely for these times comes the first written reference (1514), listing the good of Białystok. Bachelor's son Nicholas, Nicholas Bakałarzewicz, realized in 1524, his wife Catherine Wołłowiczówna, Bogoria coat of arms. After his death in 1547, according to the good will of the deceased Catherine has inherited. In the same year his widow, Catherine Wołłowiczówna, married again to Piotr Wiesiołowski (Ogończyk coat of arms) – a courtier of the Polish kings: King Sigismund the Old and Sigismund Augustus. He started in Bialystok on the borderlands of Lithuania and Polish residence. After his death in 1556, took a good Bialystok sons: Peter and John Wiesiołowski. However, after the death of the latter in 1570 became the property of Białystok Piotr Wiesiołowski (the Younger). In 1579 he married Zofia Lubomirska.

In his time began the development of Białystok. In 1581, the parish church next to the existing Piotr Wiesiołowski funded school for children. In addition, built in the years 1617–1626, the first brick church and the beautiful castle on a rectangular plan, two floors, the Gothic-Renaissance style built by Job Bretfus. Extension office continued by his son Krzysztof Wiesiołowski, since 1635 Grand Marshal of Lithuania and the owner of several administrative and royal and married Aleksandra Marianna Sobieska. In 1637 he died childless, thus Białystok came under the management of his widow. After her death in 1645 the Wiesiołowskis estate, including Białystok, passed to the Commonwealth, to maintain the castle in Tykocin. In the years 1645–1659 Bialystok managed by governors of Tykocin. It was then a part of the Grand Duchy of Lithuania.

=== Branicki Estate (1661–1802) ===
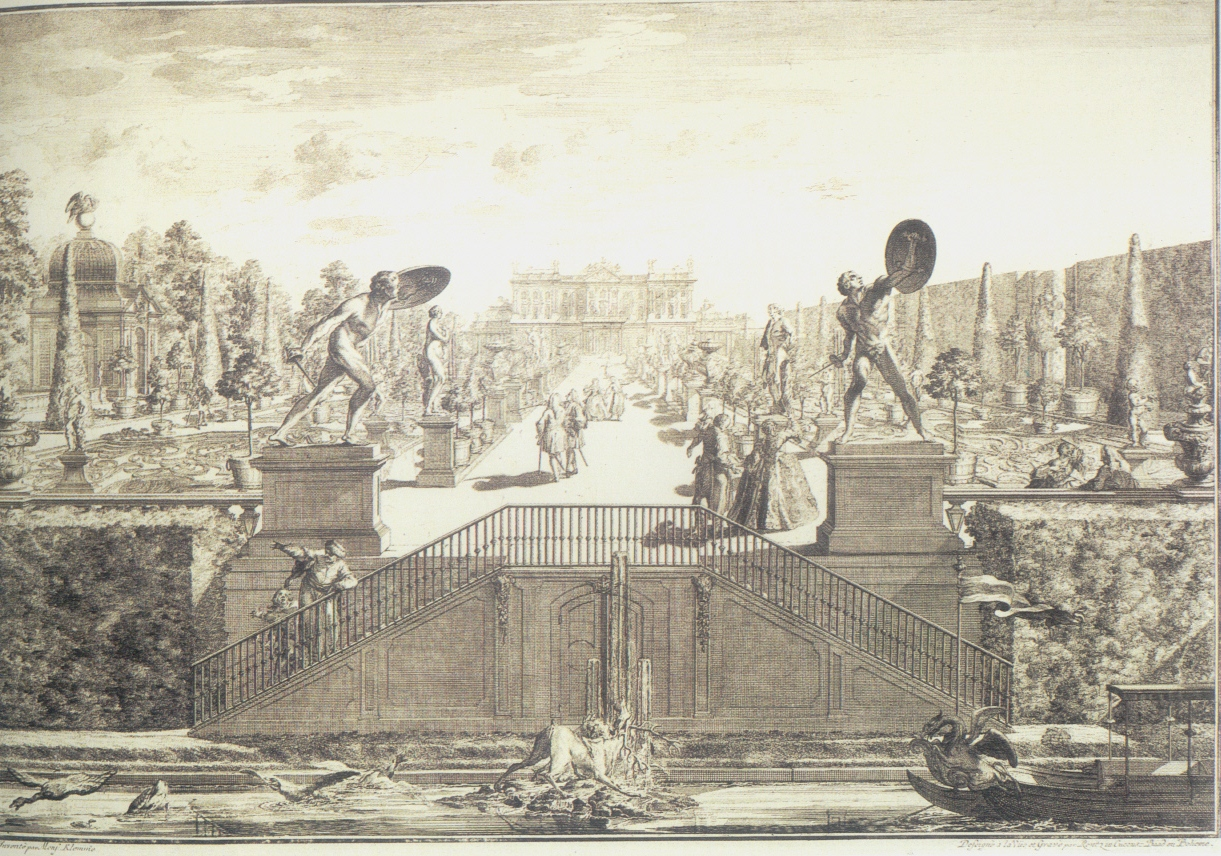
Garden of the Branicki Palace in the 18th century

In 1661 it was given to Stefan Czarniecki as a reward for his service in the victory over the Swedes. Four years later, as a dowry of his daughter Aleksandra who married Jan Klemens Branicki, thus passing into the hands of the Branicki family. The oldest known document mentioning the city of Białystok is related to the exchange of land belonging to the Branicki family and the parish church. This document is dated twice, at the beginning of the content August 27, and at the end August 30, 1691. Another document mentioning the city of Białystok is a deed issued by Stefan Mikolaj Branicki for the local Jews from July 11, 1692. The third document is a tax list prepared by the local parish priest, Father Jan Michal Głowiński on October 1, 1692.

At the turn of the 16th and 17th centuries, Białystok was still a small settlement connected with the manor that existed here. According to the register of conscription in 1580, there were 70 settlers here. The buildings of the settlement were concentrated around a large square, today's Kościuszko Market Square from which five roads of local importance ran; on this square one should also look for the inn mentioned in the conscription register of 1578. Although the vast crossroads was the center of a relatively small settlement, it however, ownership relations limited the possibilities of building development in its immediate vicinity. Because around the church there was a church property (Poświętne), on which a church jurydyka was established in the 18th century. On the other hand, the area to the south of the crossroads was occupied by the spacious "Pastewnik" also belonging to the Białystok church. The area, known as "Pastewnik" was a very attractive area for building development and it quickly lost its agricultural importance, transforming into a very intensively inhabited area. The Jewish population settled in this area from at least the middle of the 17th century, and in 1700 the church let the kehilla of Białystok perpetually lease the square, on which the synagogue at the former Szkolna street (between Suraska and Legionowa, at the level of "Delikatesy" branch of PSS Spolem). At the end of the 19th century, the Białystok Jewish community made a payment to the Białystok church for the lease of this square. Somewhat to the south-east. the original Jewish cemetery was located from the synagogue, with its fence facing the square. Around 1708, the management of the Białystok estates realized that the extensive church property was left behind the southern frontage of the then emerging market square; in the vicinity of a garden layout, it will hinder the reconstruction of the city. Therefore, a joint body was established: commisya ratione commutationi in melius placov of the church on certain lands, by means of which church buildings were transferred to the lands of the villages of the Białystok church. This change brought benefits to the clergy of Białystok; because as a result, the church's land properties were grouped in one uninterrupted line from the temple to today's Warszawska's Street.

In 1692 Stefan Mikołaj Branicki, the son of Jan Klemens Branicki, obtained the rights to the city of Białystok from King John III Sobieski and built Branicki Palace in the city on the foundations of former defensive castle of Wiesiołowskis' family. The project's author is a prominent architect: Tylman of Gameren. In the second half of the 18th century the ownership of the city was inherited by Field Crown Hetman Jan Klemens Branicki. It was he who transformed the previously existing palace built by his father into the magnificent residence of a great noble, which was frequently visited by Polish kings and poets. Numerous artists and scientists came to Białystok to take advantage of Branicki's patronage. In 1745 Branicki established Poland's first military technical college, School of Civil and Military Engineering and in 1748, one of the oldest theaters in Poland, the Komedialnia. New schools were established, including a ballet school in connection with the foundation of the theater. On 19 November 1748 marries Izabella Poniatowska as his third wife Hetman Jan Klemens Branicki. On 1 February 1749, King Augustus III of Poland awarded Białystok city rights, and extended the city limits.

Then the townspeople of Białystok through the commissar of goods Józef Wojnarowski from the Podlasie region turned to Jan Klemens Branicki, that he would obtain another royal privilege. This initiative met with understanding of the Grand Crown Hetman and it was announced in a consecutive document from 19 November 1760. the area of Bialystok was not uniform in organizational terms. Undoubtedly, the left-bank (southwest of the Biała River) part of the building was part of the city. Meanwhile, the right bank area consisting of the settlement of Bojary, Zamkowa street., Kleidorf, Nowe Miasto (the southern area of Warszawska street, not to confuse with the modern Nowe Miasto district) and Przedmieście Wasilkowski had an unspecified status. Also, a huge number of Jews and soldiers resulted in their autonomous position. In that period, only the so-called The Old Town was covered by the urban structure, the rest was treated as suburbs, villages that used municipal law. For example, A normative act on the limitation of prostitution in the city from 1752 was addressed to the hosts living "both in the city and in Bojary". However, in 1789 the Białystok local government addressed Izabela Branicka with a proposal to join the villages of Kleindorf and Nowolipie, in exchange for which he declared to participate in the market paving process. The proposal was rejected as a result of two years later, a lustration of the city of Białystok carried out by the city judge of Brahman Władysław Markowski. He noted that Bojary, Nowe Miasto (area of today's Warszawska street), Nowolipie and the palace are excluded from the city area, which entails changes in the level of tax (mainly leather tax). It was by no means a small area - in the light of a very detailed census prepared in 1793, there were 87 farms built in the right bank of Białystok. These separations were liquidated during the Prussian Partition, when the authorities of the Camera of War and Domain unified the urban structure and tried to include even the palace area into the urban area. This is confirmed by the annex to the contract of lease of the city of Białystok concluded between the Camera of the War and Domen and Izabela Branicka in 1802. According to the borders document, the entire palace and garden arrangement was excluded from urban structures, while all suburbs were already included in the city.

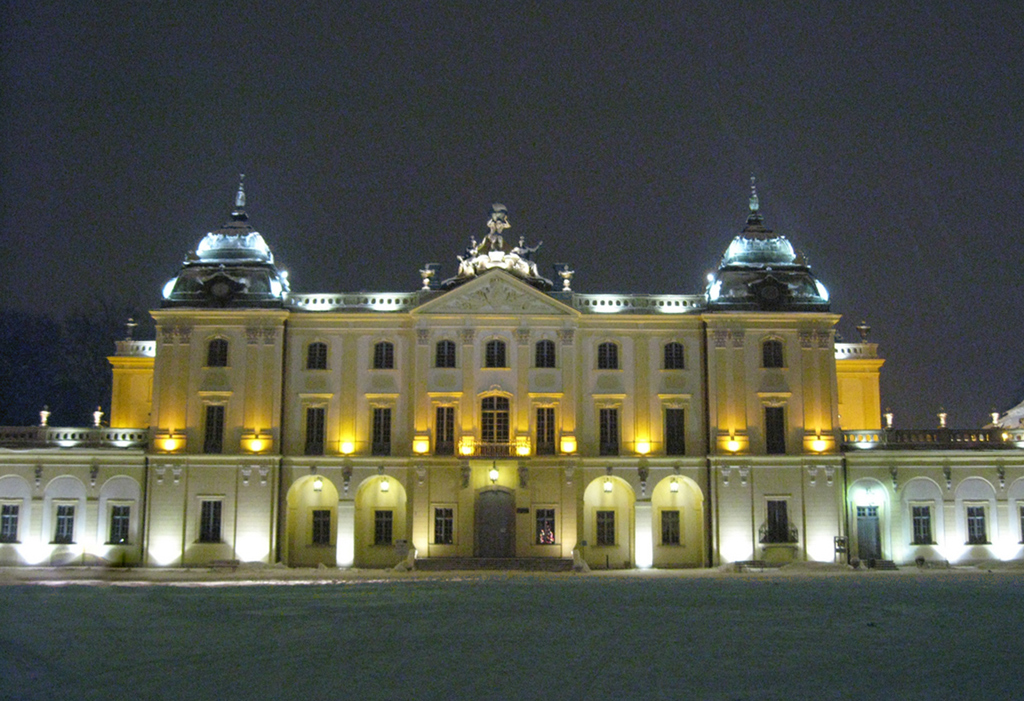
Branicki Palace

In 1753 the center of the city burns down. In 1756 Jan Klemens Branicki is divorced from his third wife. On 13 July 1769 – Battle of Białystok part of the War of the Bar Confederation. On 9 October 1771 Jan Klemens Branicki died. In 1789, the epidemic of smallpox, 22 children died. Following the third partition of the Polish-Lithuanian Commonwealth in 1795 the city first belonged to the Kingdom of Prussia as the administrative centre of the Białystok Department. On 26 January 1796 Prussian administration takes over the town, but it remains formally owned by Izabella Poniatowska-Branicka

== Modern era ==
=== New East Prussia Province (1795–1807) ===
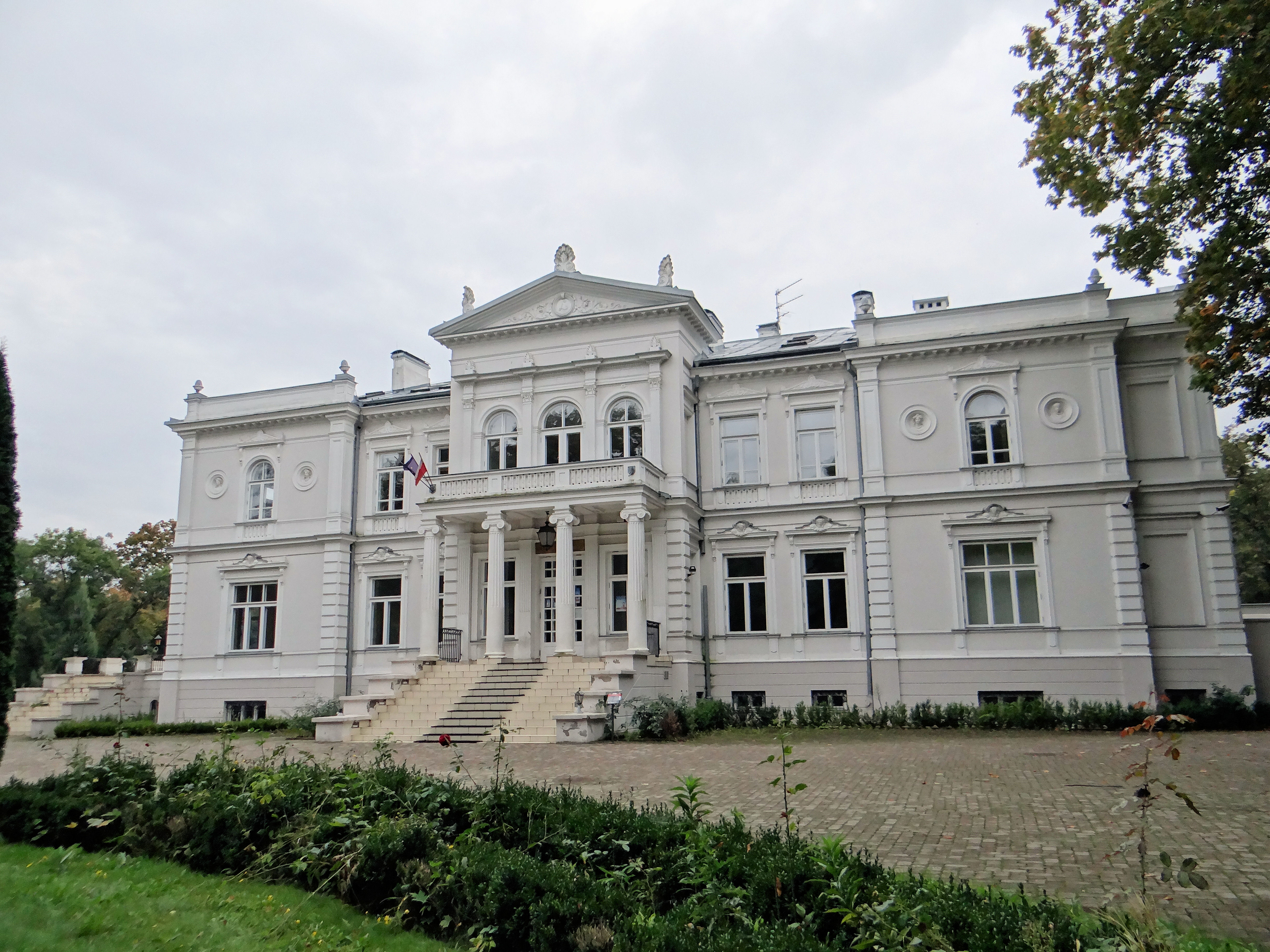
Lubomirski Palace

On 1 March 1802 the signing of an agreement between Izabella Poniatowska-Branicka and Nowowshodnią Prussian and the War – Economic Camera. On 2 April 1802 Izabella Poniatowska-Branicka sold Bialystok to the Prussian authorities for an amount over 270 thousand talarów.

=== Belostok Oblast (1807–1842) ===
After the Peace of Tilsit were signed in 1807 the city passed to Russia. During the period of Russian control the city was the capital of the Belostok Oblast, from 1807 to 1842. On 14 February 1808 Izabella Poniatowska-Branicka died. Schooling and higher learning in Białystok, which was intensively developed in the 18th century, was stopped as a result of partitions of Poland. During Napoleon's invasion to Russia, Białystok was dominated by pro-French sentiments. On 3 July 1812 – Napoleon's army enters the city on their way to Moscow. On 13 July 1812 – Declaration of the inhabitants of loyalty to the Commonwealth. On 4 August 1812 the Russian Imperial Army entered the city. On 8 August 1812 a new coat of arms for the city was given by Tsar Alexander I. the Russian Imperial Army entered it, taking revenge for their sympathy for Napoleon. In 1814, numerous Russian troops marched through Białystok, returning from France after the victory over Napoleon. Discipline was poor. There were robberies by marauders. Then, Russian regional and city authorities returned to Białystok. Direct authority was maintained following the Congress of Vienna in 1815. The tsar decided to keep the palace in the shape given to it by the Branicki family, and he also took care of its security. In 1829, the Evangelicals erected their first church (now St. Adalbert's Church).

On 13 December 1830 martial law was announced by the Russian authorities in connection with the outbreak of the November Uprising. The outbreak of the uprising found Białystok unprepared to undertake major pro-independence activities. Actions in the area of Bialystok took the character of a rebellion and sabotage rather than a direct fight. The defeat of the November Uprising marked the beginning of a period of decisive russification, confiscation of landed estates, and liquidation of the Uniate Church. The authorities sought to blur the differences between the oblast and typical Russian governorates. On 1 February 1831 the headquarters of the Russian army commander, Field Marshal Hans Karl von Diebitsch, whose task was to suppress the November Uprising were set in fire. In 1834 a ban on teaching in schools in Polish was introduced.

=== Belostok Province (1842–1914) ===
When the authorities limited Białystok's political role in the early 1840s by degrading its status from being capital of Belostok Oblast to administrative center of Belostoksky Uyezd within Grodno Governorate, land prices dropped drastically. This gave a signal for industrialists to settle down, and thus the most splendid period in terms of economic development began. About 15,000 people lived here.

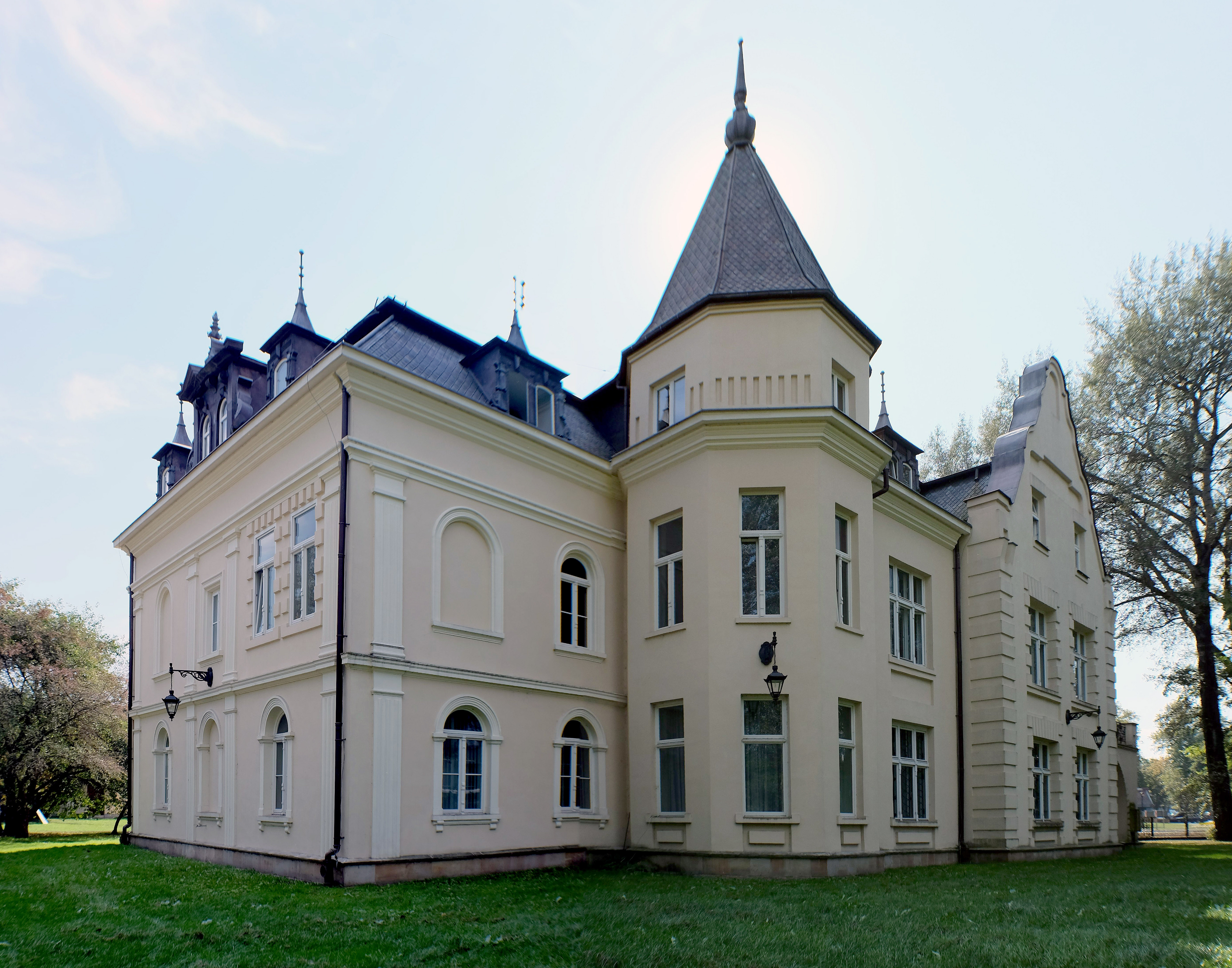
Hasbach Palace

In 1843, a decision was made to build a Saint Nicholas Cathedral. After the introduction of a restrictive duty on textile products on the border between the Congress Poland and the Russian Empire, the textile industry began to develop in the city and its vicinity. On 15 December 1859 Ludwik Zamenhof, the creator of the international language Esperanto, was born in Zielona Street in the city. 13 June 1860 saw the beginning of a patriotic demonstration under the banner of national unity and fight against russification. On 9 June 1861 representative of the Whites, Andrzej Artur Zamoyski arrived in the city. 1862 saw Opening of the Saint Petersburg–Warsaw Railway through the city. 24 April 1863 marked the beginning of the January Uprising in the Białystok area. On the night of January 22/23, 1863, conspirators from the Łapy area were doing sabotage activities. They made an unsuccessful attempt to stop traffic on the new main line. The uprising in Białystok actually began in April, and the first, not very fortunate, battle took place near Waliły. Białystok itself was not a battlefield, as there was a large Russian garrison here. Underground activity flourished in the city. Martial law was maintained here from 1870, and then the use of the Polish language in public places was forbidden. In 1877 the city limits were expanded, integrated the railway station, the village of Piaski and Zwierzyniecki Forest. In 1888, the railway line Białystok – Vawkavysk – Baranovichi The first telephone exchange was launched in 1891 and in 1895 the first three lines of horse trams. In 1898 the Volunteer Fire Department was established.

During the 19th century the city became a major center of textile industry. Due to an industrial boom the population grew from 13,787 in 1857, and 56,629 in 1889, to 65,781 in 1901.

=== End of the 19th century and beginning of the 20th century ===
At the end of the 19th century, as a result of the influx due to Russian discriminatory regulations, the majority of the city's population was Jewish. According to Russian census of 1897, out of the total population of 66,000, Jews constituted 41,900 (so around 63%). This heritage can be viewed on the Jewish Heritage Trail in Bialystok.

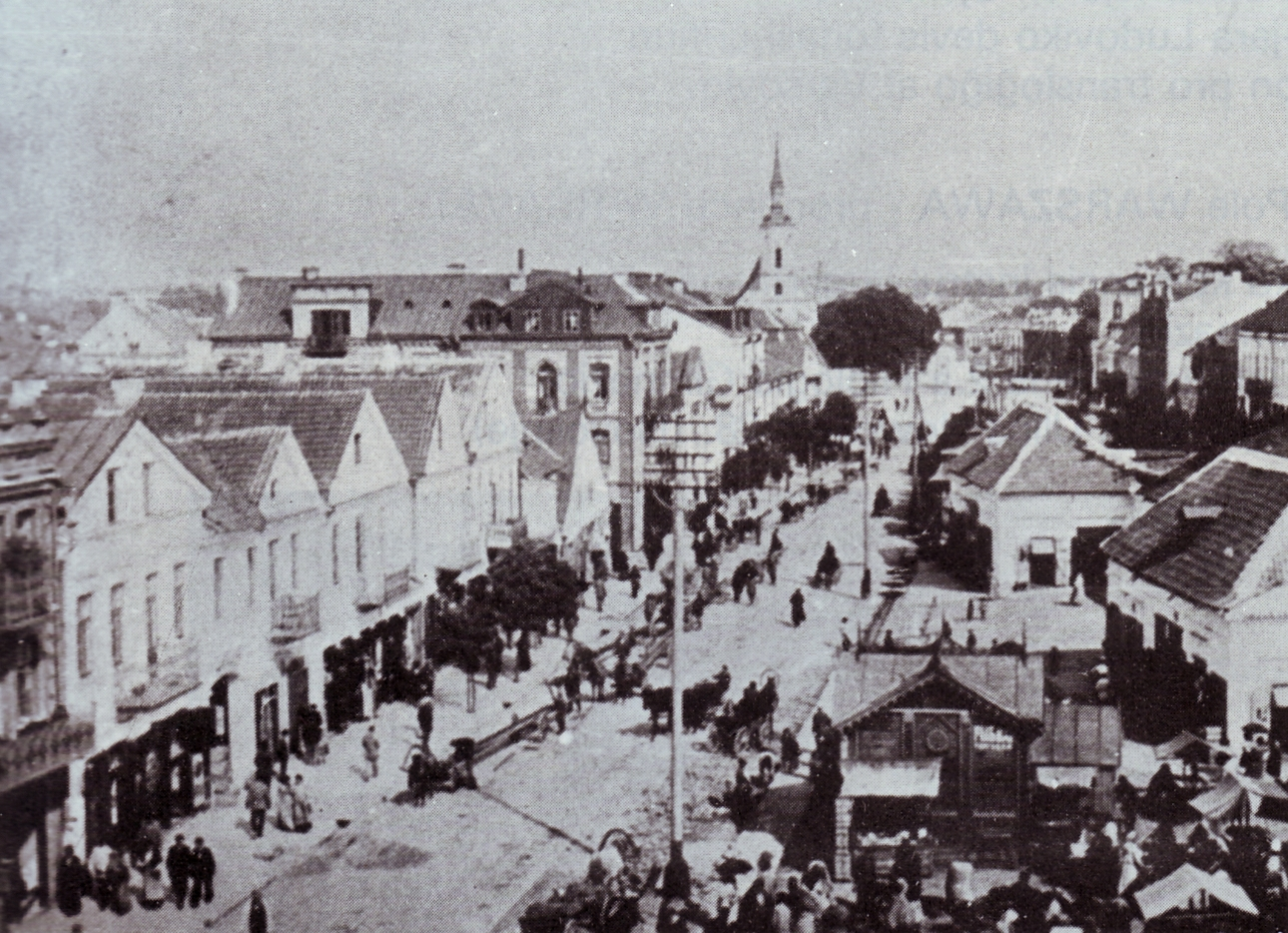
Market Square in 1900

The dynamic development of Białystok in the last quarter of the 19th and the beginning of the 20th century resulted in a complete transformation of the city, which soon became an important economic and economic center of the western governorates of Russia. As a consequence of the enormous population growth, the increase in the number of industrial plants and architectural and urban transformations, new, hitherto unknown civilization needs appeared. Białystok was becoming a large city of supra-regional importance, the proverbial "Manchester of the North", in which the lack of basic communal facilities, determining the quality of life of the inhabitants, was felt more and more every year. without the existence of which the functioning of an urban center of this scale was simply impossible. Those improvements appeared in Białystok only in the last decade of the 19th century. a horse-drawn trolley running along the main thoroughfares, many streets were paved, so far without adequate pavement, the former palace pond was filled in and the construction of a city park began in its place. first electric lighting in place of kerosene. It wasn't until 1908 that The company of Electrical Companies from Berlin started building the first municipal power plant, located at the intersection of Branickiego and Elektryczna streets. At that time, a temporary sewage system appeared, installed ad hoc by the City Council or property owners. Mikołaj Miłakowski, describing Białystok in 1897, noted: one can hope that Białystok will soon find itself in a row with those cities that are famous for their cleanliness and equipment.

The first Anarchist groups to attract a significant following of Russian workers or peasants, were the Anarcho-Communist Chernoe-Znamia groups, founded in Białystok in 1903. Their ranks included mostly students, factory workers and artisans, though there were also peasants, unemployed laborers, drifters, and self-professed Nietzschean supermen. They drew their support mainly from the impoverished and persecuted working-class Jews of the "Pale"-the places on the Western borders of the Russian Empire where Jews were "allowed" to live.

Due to worsening work conditions, new strikes took place in 1895 and reached their peak in 1905 when during the 1905 Russian Revolution the city was a center of the radical labor movement, with strong organizations of the General Jewish Labour Bund and the Polish Socialist Party as well as the more radical anarchists of the Chernoe-Znamia (Black Banner) association.. On January 30, 1905 a major strike of industrial workers took place. On March 18, there was an unsuccessful attack on the deputy police chief of Bialystok. On August over 50 people died in Supraska Street from the fire of the security forces.

The Białystok pogrom occurred between 14 and 16 June 1906 in the city. During the pogrom between 81 and 88 people were killed by the Russians, and about 80 people were wounded.

In 1912, a Tsarist prison was built, which also served as a transit prison for Poles deported to Siberia.

=== World War I (1914–1918) ===
After the outbreak of the First World War in 1914, economic life kept going. In 1915 situation worsened. Day and night, trains transported the Russian army and military supplies towards East Prussia, and then, following the defeat at Battle of Tannenberg - transported the wounded and refugees in the opposite direction. On April 20, 1915, the city experienced the first air raid in history by German aircraft, resulting in 13 deaths and 38 injured. Several fires broke out, the largest occurring in the area of Lipowa Street. It took firefighters 20 hours to extinguish them. In mid-July, it became clear that the Russians were leaving the city, taking away machines and equipment from factories, raw materials and goods, furniture, and what they could not take with them, they burned or blew up. They destroyed, among other things, water towers, part of the power plant and railway equipment, and a viaduct over the tracks along Dąbrowskiego Street. The city temporarily lost its industrial character. Along with the army and the tsarist administration, most of the Orthodox population left, because official propaganda frightened them with the alleged bestiality of the approaching German troops. This phenomenon went down in history as the so-called Bieżeństwo. On August 13, 1915, Russian rule in Białystok, which had lasted since 1807, ended. On the same day German soldiers of 12th Army the headed by General Max von Gallwitz appeared in Białystok. The city was included in the Ober Ost occupational region as the capital of the Bialystok-Grodno District.

On 18 March 1918 it was declared part of the Belarusian National Republic until 19 February 1919 when the city was taken by Poland.

=== Polish independence ===
On 11 November 1918, following the end of World War I, Marshal Józef Piłsudski, declared the establishment of the Second Polish Republic. Białystok and the region around it was kind of a buffer zone between the newly established Polish state and Soviet Russia. However, after Germany's defeat, over half a million German soldiers remained in Russia. On 11 November 1918, following the end of World War I, Marshal Józef Piłsudski, declared the establishment of the Second Polish Republic. At the same time, the German garrison in Bialystok, officers formed a Soldiers' Council (Soldatenrat) commanded by Lewandowski, a soldier from the Prussian partition. In 1917, the Central National Committee existed in the city, Białystok District, at the head of which they stood priest Stanisław Nawrocki, pastor from Zabłudów and pharmacist Feliks Filipowicz. Upon hearing of Polish troops approaching Białystok on the night of November 11-12, the National Central Committee concluded an agreement with the Council, the aim of which was to maintain peace in the city. The Germans pledged to hand over their weapons and warehouses, while the Poles guaranteed them a safe departure to Eastern Prussia. Some of the Polish troops that found themselves in Łapy went to Białystok, where they were to support the Self-Defense Guards that had been created earlier, being a formation organized by officers from the corps of general Józef Dowbor-Muśnicki, students who, under the command of Tuśkiewicz, formed a force of 50 people and began setting up posts in key locations in the city, including the train station, food warehouses, the bank, and the city hall.

German authorities tried to isolate the population of the occupied areas such as Białystok from the newly established Polish state. Temporary eastern border reborn and Poland was to be insured by the Lithuanian-Belarusian Division of general Wacław Iwaszkiewicz and the Podlasie Division of general Antoni Lisowski organized in Biała Podlaska. On November 14, the arrival of the announced large Polish military detachment was expected. Instead, only 150 soldiers arrived from Łapy. This was a result of the rapidly changing international situation. On November 8th, a demarcation line was established, separating the emerging Polish state from the German forces remaining in the east, numbering over half a million soldiers. On November 24th, 1918, the provisions of the so-called Kaunas Agreement came into effect, under which the Białystok Voivodeship became part of the cordon between east and west. Also significant was the fact that Białystok was a key railway junction in the region, enabling the transport of German troops impending revolt over the coming months.

From December 1918, the Polish government commissioner Ignacy Mrozowski resided in Białystok. However, the situation was difficult and troublesome. The Germans took away the entire archive, leaving the municipal cash register empty. In addition, the organizational structure of the German military authorities deepened and demoralized groups of soldiers roamed the city.

A General Civil Commissioner was then appointed to the Military Board of the Eastern Borderlands, which was to be the highest civil instance in the discussed territories - ruling and executive. In the field, commissioners were assigned to individual armies as inspectors of the General Civilian Commissioner powiat commissioners were to administer the poviat. Maciej Jamontt became the district commissioner for the areas of Białystok, his competences extended to powiats: Białystok, Bielsk, Sokółka, Grodno and Wołkowysk. Augusta Cyfrowicz was appointed as commissioner of the Białystok Poviat, his deputy was Bolesław Szymański, and the government commissioner of Białystok, Napoleon Cydzik (he was to cooperate with the Provisional Municipal Committee, as well as prepare and conduct in the first municipal elections).

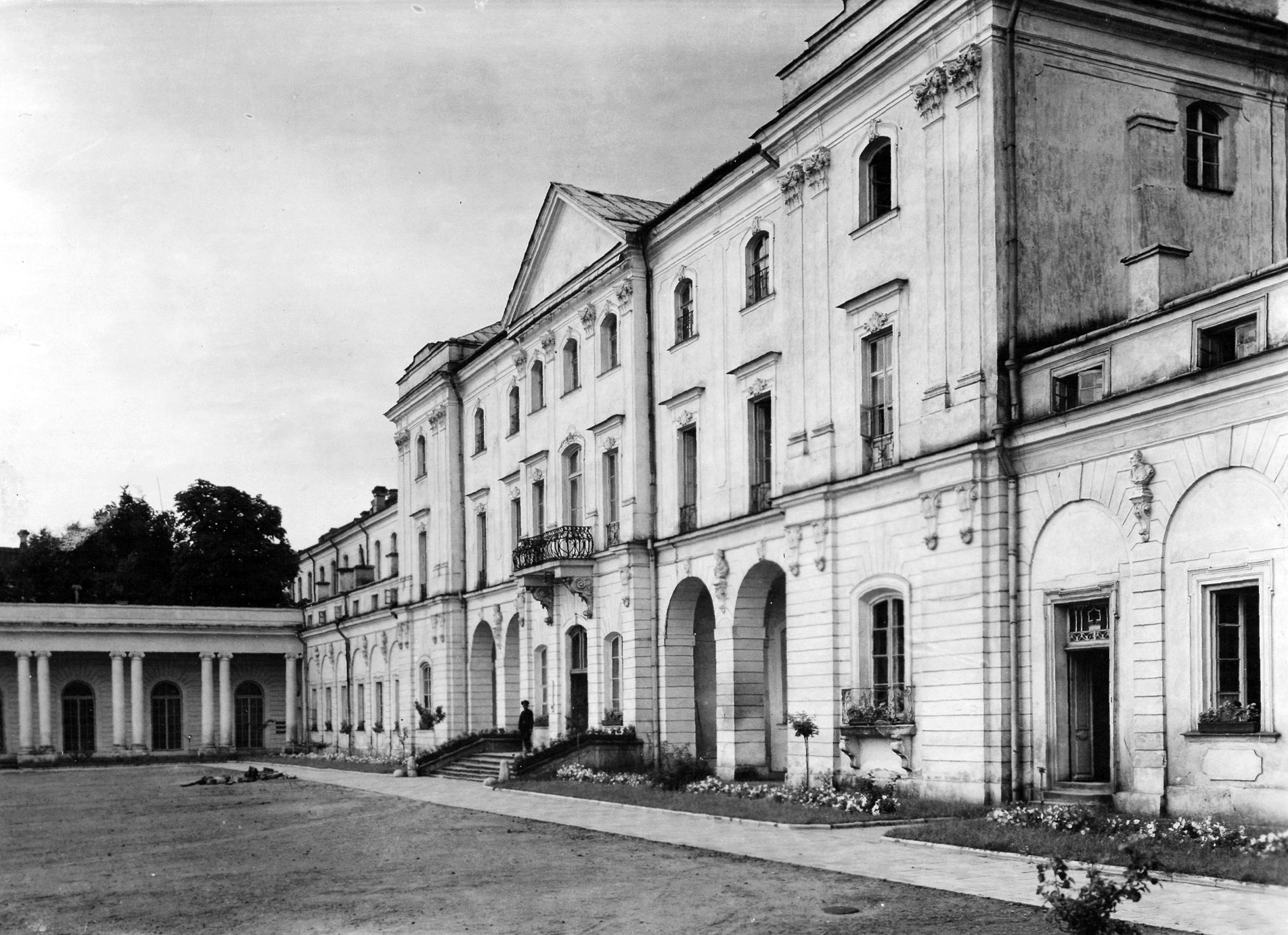
Branicki Palace in interwar Poland

The German command wanted to keep the railway lines at all costs, so that this army could return to Germany, and there were only two roads: through Białystok and Grajewo to East Prussia or through Warsaw to Berlin. Józef Piłsudski chose to avoid the option of German Army passing through the center of the country and be withdrawn by road through Białystok. Therefore, Białystok had to be left in German hands. On 5 February 1919, another Polish-German agreement (Białystok Agreement) was signed, so that where the German army withdrew, Polish troops could enter, because of the Russian Revolution and they were afraid of the occupation of other cities by the Red Army. Following that, a Provisional Municipal Committee was created, headed by Józef Karol Puchalski, a long serving member of the city council consisting of 16 local citizens, including 6 Poles. Representatives representing the Polish, Jewish, German and Russian communities sat on the committee. On 8 February 1919, the Committee met again. A German commander of Białystok, Roszer, sat next to Puchalski, and gave a farewell speech. Over the next days, the Germans liquidated their administration.

The retreating German Army set in fire the barracks in Osowiec Fortress as well as in Tragutta Street in Białystok. On 16 February 1919, Polish troops entered Bielsk Podlaski, the next day Polish military authorities arrived in Białystok welcomed by Ignacy Mrozowski. Colonel Stanisław Dziewulski was nominated for the first commandant of Białystok. Finally, in accordance with the agreement with the Germans, on 19 February 1919, Polish troops entered Białystok. According to with earlier arrangements, Germans were to leave Białystok at 2:00AM. There was a two-hour delay and the army left the city at 4:00 AM. Some branches waited for more trains at the station. Citizens arrived to the city center, expecting the soldiers. The weather was rainy, there was also anxiety as for will they come for sure. Around 9 p.m. the first uhlans entered the town from the side of Lipowa Street, the infantry entered from Kilińskiego Street. As it turned out, they were only patrols. The main troops entered Bialystok a little later.

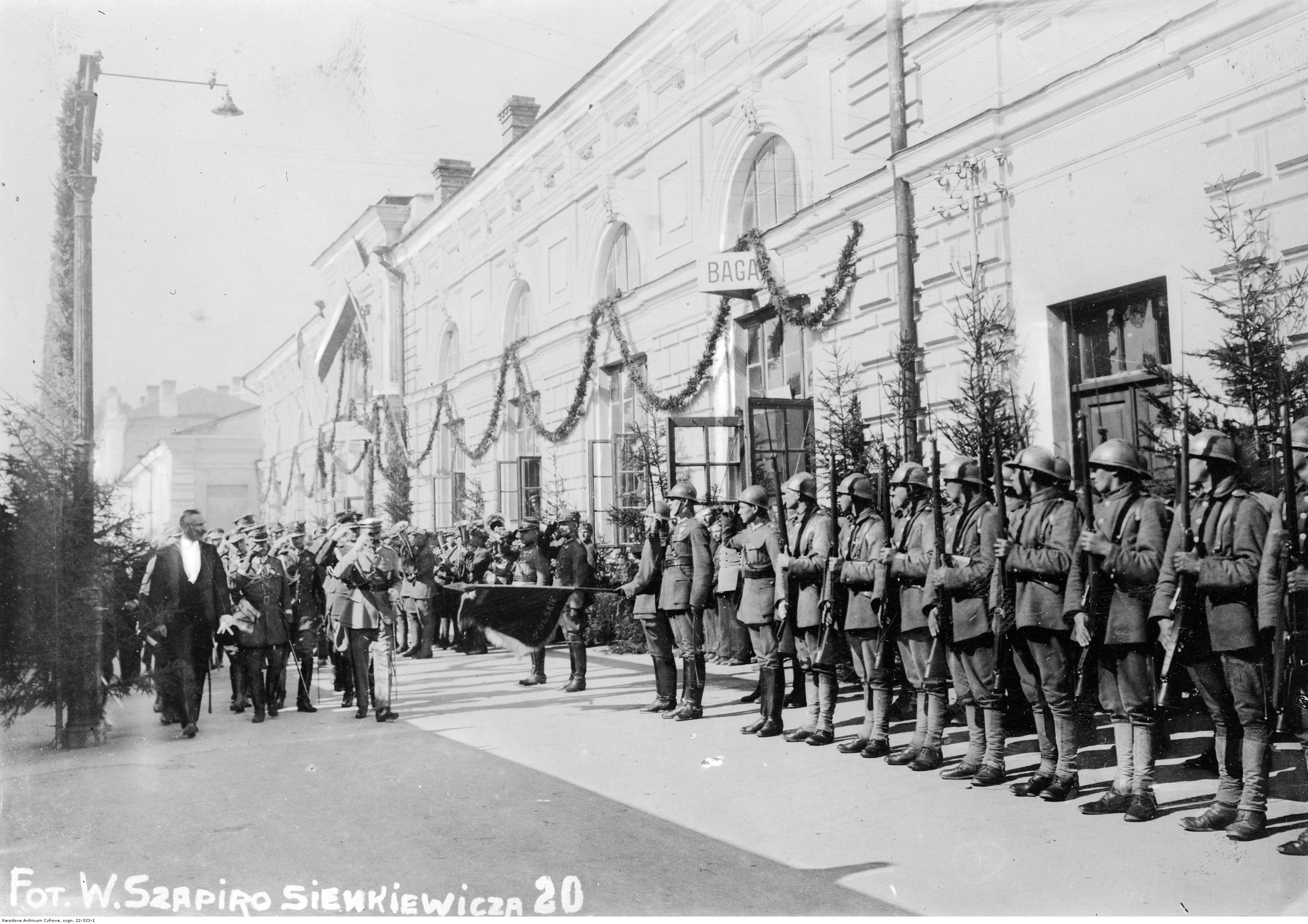
Józef Piłsudski's visit to Białystok in 1921

All were led to the Lubczyński confectionery, where a meal was organized. In the morning, infantry entered the city of Białystok under the command of Stefan Pasławski who a few years later he was the voivode of Białystok. Uhlans appeared, commanded by Colonel Stanisław Dziewulski. An official ceremony was prepared for Thursday and Friday takeover of Białystok from German hands. The official transfer of power and main celebrations took place on Saturday, 22 February 1919: On the day of welcoming Polish troops, it was freezing rain, which made horses slide on the pavement. The soldiers successfully reached the Market Square. The official welcome of the Polish Army began with a field mass celebrated by Father Lucjan Chalecki. The altar was set in front of the gate of the Białystok Cathedral. After its completion interim president Józef Karol Puchalski welcomed everyone and passed on symbolic bread and salt to colonel Stanisław Dziewulski. Captain Delhaes then spoke on behalf of the former commander of the German garrison. He said that, as a liaison officer, I have the honor of handing over control of the city of Białystok to the Polish authorities on behalf of the German military command. "I express my joy that the takeover of power is taking place peacefully, without bloodshed, and I wish you every success in the future" The ceremony on the market ended with a festive parade. In the evening, the audience watched the theater "Revenge" of Alexander Fredro. The show was prepared by team of the Torch Society, led by Zygmunt Różycki. After the performance, Rena Ruszczewska (at the time 18 years old) recited a poem specially prepared for the ceremony. The ceremony in the market square concluded with a parade. In the evening, at the Palace Theatre, a packed audience watched Fredro's "Zemsta" with emotion. The city became part of the reborn Poland as the capital of Białystok Voivodeship.

The image of the newly established capital of the voivodeship was far from a big city. After more than a hundred years of partitions, Białystok transformed from a small town developing in the shadow of an elegant magnate residence into a chaotic regional city. The city center, on the threshold of independence, however, appeared to be a provincial, neglected, dirty city, dominated by ubiquitous factory buildings, with a chaotic network of streets, bumpy roads and smelly alleys. Such a picture also emerges from the city plans of the time as they show how much the 19th-century transformations blurred the old baroque spatial composition, and the Branicki Palace lost its original integrity with the urban context. The city center in Białystok at the onset of the 20th century was a mixture of heterogeneous, diversified, of various scale and character, mostly wooden. Distinguished eclectic tenement houses, were embedded along the main streets during the construction rush of the last decade of the 19th century, often in Białystok bricklaying school (Polish: Białostocka szkoła muratorska).

==== Polish–Soviet War ====
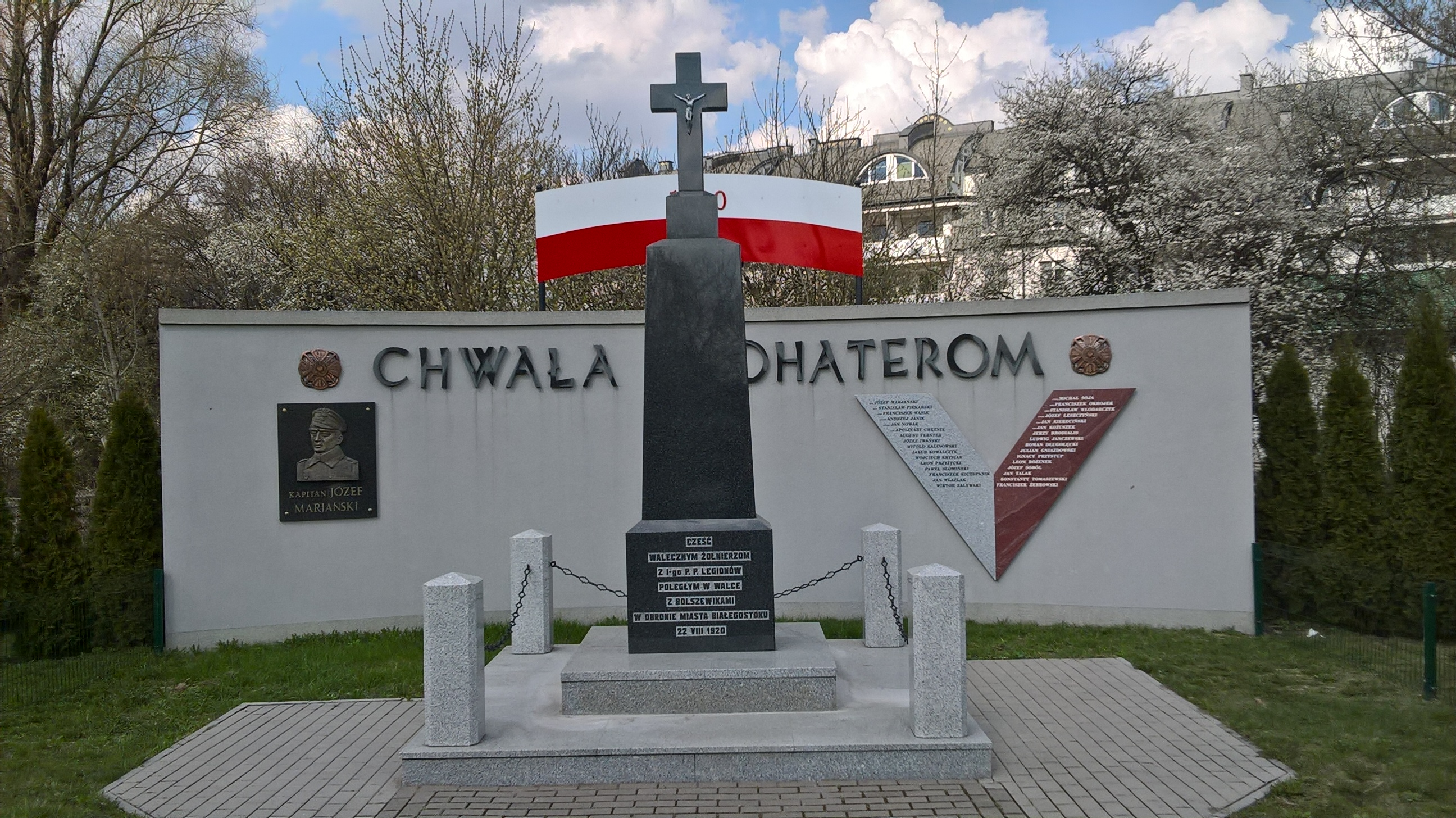
Monument to soldiers of the 1st Legions Infantry Regiment fallen in the Battle of Białystok in 1920, Antoniuk district

As the front of the Polish–Soviet War was approaching to the city, on 13 June 1920, the Citizens' Committee for National Defence (Polish: Obywatelski Komitet Obrony Narodowej) was established. Its presidium included Karol Tołłoczko, Władysław Kolendo, Kazimierz Riegert and city president Boleslaw Szymański. Additionally, he was given the authority to create a volunteer army by order of General Józef Haller. The last meeting of the Committee in Białystok took place on 27 July, a few hours before the Bolsheviks occupied the city. When overrun by the Red Army during the Polish-Soviet War, the city briefly served as headquarters of the Polish Revolutionary Committee headed by Julian Marchlewski, which attempted to declare the Polish Soviet Socialist Republic. The next meeting of the Polish municipal authorities (Citizens' Committee for National Defence) took place in Wysokie Mazowieckie, from where the Committee left for Warsaw. Only on 18 September 1920 president Szymański returned to the city. The Peace of Riga, signed 18 March 1921, formally included the city in the Second Polish Republic.

=== Inter-war period ===
In the years 1919–1939, the city was part of the Second Polish Republic as the seat of the Białystok Voivodeship. The city, whose population reached 107,000 in 1939, was the Voivodeship's lone industrial center.

After the wars and the reestablishment of independent Poland, Polish education in Białystok was restored and the textile industry was revived. A municipal public library was established, sports clubs were founded, including Jagiellonia Białystok, and in the 1930s a dramatic theater was built.

On 7 September 1919, the first election to the Białystok City Council (Polish: Rada Miejska) was held. By expressing their opposition to including suburbs in the city limits, the Jews did not vote. The turnout was only 12%. The election was won by the Polish Electoral Committee (Polish: Polski Komitet Wyborczy), which received 35 seats out of 42. As President of the city was elected Bolesław Szymański and Feliks Filipowicz became the chairman of the Białystok City Council.

The Białystok District of the State Police was established on August 20, 1919. In 1939, there were four police stations in Białystok: I at Pierackiego Street 3, II at Pierackiego Street 65, III at Mickiewicza Street 7, and IV at Lipowa Street 47. Until 1926, the V police station was located at the railway station, which was later transformed into a railway police station (Polish: Posterunek Kolejowy Policji Panstwowej). The Białystok police also cooperated with the Border Protection Corps command in protecting the country's eastern border. The Powiat Command of the State Police resided at 62 Pierackiego street while the Voivodeship Command of the State Police was headquartered at 50 Pierackiego street.

In the interwar period, Białystok had four post and telecommunications offices. The main post office was located in a building at 10 Kościelna Street and was designated Białystok-1. The telephone network in the city was established in the 1890s and was operated by PAST. The Białystok regional headquarters of PAST was located at 10 Warszawska Street, where there were also telephone exchanges available to residents (and in addition to each post office). Before the outbreak of World War II, there were fewer than 2,000 telephone numbers in Białystok. The city could also boast of having a connection with foreign countries and on March 16, 1932, the press proudly reported that Białystok had a telephone connection with New Zealand.

==== Education ====
On 7 November 1919 in accordance with governmental decree on compulsory education, a free primary school for children aged 7–14. Until 1922, the number of primary schools in Bialystok rose to 14 (from 5 in 1919), private and religious education was also organized. Gradually, language learning was introduced. In the first period after completion there were two junior high schools (on Warszawska Street and 9 Kościelna Street), over time, a third (on 1 Mickiewicza street) and four Jewish ones were opened. On 23 May 1920 the City Public Library was opened at 1 Kilińskiego, had 3,500 book volumes and 40 magazine titles.

==== Healthcare ====
For reconstruction and the reorganization of the health service, Dr. Zygmunt Brodowicz came to the city on behalf of the Minister of Health and from 1927 became the Head of the Labor Department and Social Welfare, then the Health Department in the Białystok Voivoedship Office. He was the main organizer and coordinator of the construction of a psychiatric hospital in 56 Choroszczanska Street. As a result of his activity, the Infectious Hospital which was established in 1919 at 33 Sw. Rocha street was moved to Wojskowa 11/13 street, where it became the property of the city hall as the Municipal Hospital. In 1921, the District Hospital (Polish: Szpital Okręgowy which was established in 1852 in 47 Lipowa street was renamed the St. Rocha Municipal Hospital. In 1931, it was moved to 11 Piwna Street. In the 1920s it was directed by Konrad Fiedorowicz In the 1930s, there were four private obstetrics and gynaecology clinics with 26 beds and an ophthalmology clinic with 10 beds. All of these facilities were run by Jewish doctors. In addition, specialist clinic operated at 5 Mazowiecka street and a Ambulatory care operated by the Organization for Protection of the Jewish population (TOZ) at 27 Fabryczna street.

==== Economy ====
From the second half of 1919, industry in Białystok began to work for the needs of the Polish Army and administration. Growing sales in the internal market has stabilized the economic situation, although the city was still in the vicinity of the front, and the Polish–Soviet War and thus there were organizational difficulties: transport restrictions, numerous stationing troops, robberies, etc. The end of hostilities, so awaited, paradoxically complicated the industrial situation of the city. Along with the end of military operations, military orders ended following the sealed the border with the Soviet Union, which resulted in a drastic reduction in sales for manufactured goods. Entrepreneurs were forced to look for new recipients (China, Japan, the Baltic States and the Balkans), but here too there were problems: high duties, inflation, significant increase in raw material prices and production costs. The problems with the sales markets resulted in the period lasting until 1931 (excluding the period of relatively good economic situation for 1926–1928) stagnation in the textile industry.

On July 18, 1922, a natural cataclysm struck the city which further created strain on the economic situation. It began with a violent storm that passed over the city. Afterward, torrential rains began. Meanwhile, on the night of July 26-27, the Biała River flooded. The first alarms were received by the Białystok fire brigade from the riverside district. Houses were flooded there, and the water level was constantly rising. In the morning of July 27, the city could hear the prolonged wailing of sirens. All the single-story houses were flooded. The strong, almost torrential current of the river threatened to collapse them. Residents took refuge on the floors of tenement buildings. They were cut off from the rest of the city, as crossing from one side of the river to the other was impossible. The only remaining access was via the bridge at Pałacowa Street. Other bridges were submerged. The river also flooded the Municipal Garden and carried away the distinctive, arched bridge. It also began to threaten the power plant. Its basements were flooded. As a result, one of the turbines had to be shut down. Part of the city was left without power. Firefighters and power plant personnel made tremendous efforts to protect the plant from complete flooding. Unfortunately, the workers at the nearby Palace Theatre were unsuccessful, finding themselves halfway underwater. Sets and stage equipment were completely destroyed, and the floors in dressing rooms, the orchestra pit, and half of the auditorium were raised by the water. A dramatic situation also arose in the factories located along the Białka River. The factories of Markus, Prejsman, Polak, Gubiński, Fuks, Tabaczyński, and Jerozolimski were closed. Part of the Nowik factory was also flooded. The losses were significant in all plants.

==== Infrastructure and urban layout ====
In the interwar period, massive investments were carried out to liquidate backwardness of the city caused by the periods of the First World War and tsarist occupation policy. They joined the road construction (about 100 km of road surfaces were commissioned in the period in question), 25 km of sidewalks were laid, further residential houses were erected (around 1935 there were over 5,000 of them, 70% of which were connected to the municipal water supply system), works on the regulation of the Biała River and the extension of the sewage network. The designation of Białystok on the seat of the voivodeship, a center of government administration led to understanding that a major change in the development of the city was needed in order to make it on the same row with other voivodeship capitals in Poland.

The spatial chaos increased in the first months after regaining independence, when the people of Białystok, deprived of a roof over their heads and ruined by the war, and the "currents" returning from Russia after the Riga Peace in 1921, as well as refugees from Soviet Russia, built poor wooden houses in Bojary, Piaski and Antoniuk. The annexation of the surrounding villages and hamlets to Białystok in 1919 had an identical effect: Antoniuk, Bialostoczek, Dojlidy, Dziesieciny, Marczuk, Ogrodniczki, Pieczurki, Skorupy, Starosielce, Słoboda, Wygoda, Wysoki Stoczek, Zacisze, Zwierzyniec (area of Letniska Street). Dozens of single-storey, two-room wooden cottages appeared, scattered over a large area. In 1921, out of 6,370 buildings, only 31% were made of brick. It was not until the end of the 1920s that the authorities began to establish so-called residential colonies. Such estates, consisting of houses with carefully designed architecture, with gardens and good access, were built in Bażantarnia, Marczuk, Nowe Miasto, Zacisze and on Świętojańska Street (officials estates).

Białystok did not give the impression of an industrial city. The streets branching off from the city center, with a total length of 70 km, created rectangular districts. The southwestern part of the city was chaotic and irregular; the condition of the streets was poor, there was a lack of lighting and sewage installations. According to the calculations of the city administration in 1932, Białystok had 378 streets, of which 237 remained without sidewalks and cobblestones. The authorities tried to give the city a more modern look. In the interwar period, about 100 km of new streets and 25 km of concrete pavements were put into use (the pre-war pavements preserved here and there are impressive in their solidity). In 1927, only a dozen or so meters of Lipowa Street were covered with asphalt. In the years 1932-1934, as many as 2,000 private residential houses were built in the city, mostly wooden (the districts of Bojary, Piaski, Antoniuk, Słoboda). Shortly before the outbreak of World War II, almost 70% of the city's houses were connected to the water supply network. After 1937, work began on regulating the Biała river, which flooded large areas every few years, especially along the now non-existent Nadrzeczna Street.

In the mid-1920s, the possibility of obtaining a state loan for cooperative housing construction appeared. Cooperatives were established with the telling names "Zdobycz Urzędnicza", "Zdobycz Kolejarzy" or "Zdobycz Robotnicza". A cooperative of local government officials obtained funds to build houses on Podleśna, Piwna and Wersalska streets. The railway workers intended to create a housing estate of cheap, economical houses in the Marczuk district, on the land adjacent to the railway between Konduktorska, Promienna and Reymonta streets. In 1934, 18 small, wooden houses were already ready. The "Zdobyczy Robotnicza" colony was built in the Wygoda district at 42 Pułku Piechotej street. It was organized on the model of the Warsaw cooperative. However, internal conflicts led to the suspension of the investment. The city began to fall apart after 1932, when after the dissolution of the City Council, Seweryn Nowakowski took over the function of government commissioner. In June 1933, under his chairmanship, the Białystok Expansion Committee was organized. Its task was to initiate and coordinate undertakings serving the modern expansion of the city, so that it would become a modern administrative center. The first urban plan was drawn up in the years 1938–1939 at the request of the Union.

In order to shape a new face of the city, restore the Polish identity lost during the partitions, redefine the character of many places, and thoroughly modernize the neglected downtown. This was the goal of the implementation of the newly designed public space: a representative district, a flagship municipal and regional investment implemented in stages from the second half of the years twenties. The district, in which the center of the most important state institutions were located, included the area of the palace and garden complex with the Voivodeship Office located in the Branicki Palace, and Mickiewicza Street where new government buildings such as the Tax Chamber and the District Court were built in 1933, and houses of the clerical housing colony, as well as recreational space: the modernized 19th-century Municipal Park and Planty Park with boulevards established in a wasteland place, the former Deer Zoo. Moreover, the extensive Constitution of 3 May Park in the Zwierzyniecki Forest was integrated with the district, connecting it with an axially wide promenade into a common space.

An urban plan was developed for the systematic development of the city in and was approved in 1938. it was assumed among others location of industrial centers in Fasty, Starosielce and Dojlidy, delineation of transit roads on the east–west and north–south axes, and a brick housing estate was constructed on the site of the poor Jewish district of Chanajki. The Aleksander Węgierki Dramatic Theatre was completed in 1938. green areas were regulated, and parks were marked out such as Planty Park. Throughout the interwar period it was located in at the corner of today's Kilińskiego and Pałacowa Streets, the neo-Baroque "Ritz" Hotel, which played the role trade and market town hall (with a guard observation tower located on the tower).

==== Jewish community ====
The Torah education system in Białystok during the 1930s was unique in that the Cheder and the Mesivta Yeshiva were both in the same city and under the same educational system. Most other cities only had a cheder.

=== World War II (1939–1944) ===
At the end of July 1939, a large-scale operation of digging anti-aircraft ditches in the city began. Most of them were to be located downtown, in the area of two railway stations and barracks. Local citizens participated in rebounds for the purchase of armaments for the army. For example, employees of the Plywood State Factory in Dojlidy, employing over 400 people, bought a heavy machine gun for the Polish Armed Forces. Also, money was collected for the National Defense Fund (Polish: Fundusz Obrony Narodowej) and Maritime Defense Fund (Polish: Fundusz Obrony Morskiej). On the eve of the outbreak of the war, growing espionage and subversion activities took place, which strained the relations with the local Germans, and from 13 May, it was banned to hold public gatherings among German population.

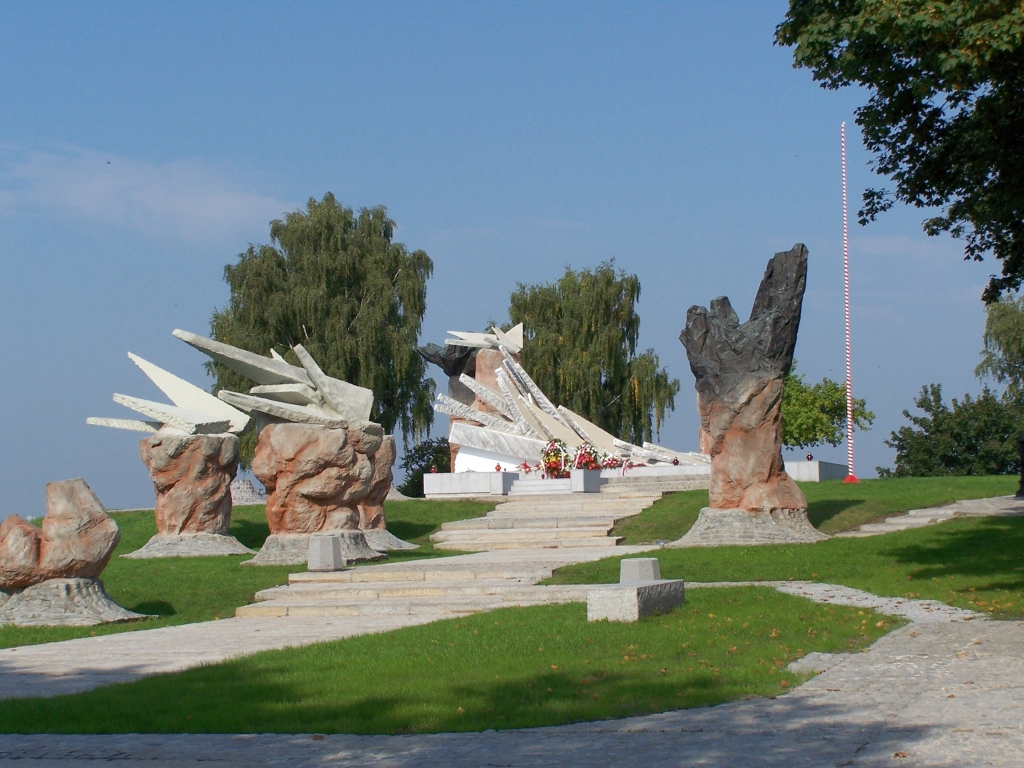
Monument to the Defenders of Białystok

On 1 September 1939, the German invasion of Poland began starting World War II. German bomber squadrons flew over the areas of the then Białystok Voivodeship, the first bombs fell in the area of Białystok railway station and military barracks. From September 4, the Citizen Guard (Polish: Straż Obywatelska), established by the city president Seweryn Nowakowski, was operating in the city, tasked with supporting and replacement functions for the police and the army which were evacuated. The local press reported on the successes of the Polish Forces and the raids of Polish Air Force on Berlin. Only the information about the entry into East Prussia of cavalry squadrons supported by horse artillery proved to be true. On the first defensive line there was relative calm; there were only fights around Myszyniec and Grajewo. According to the Polish defense plans, Białystok was not intended for defense, and the military units located in the city took positions far from their garrison. However, the news coming from Narew led to the decision to resist: Lieutenant Colonel Zygmunt Szafranowski (commander of the District Command of Supplements and at the same time the oldest rank officer in Białystok) and Captain Tadeusz Kosiński decided to fight using the marching and spare units as well as groups of soldiers retreating from Narew. They had at their disposal primarily the marching battalion of the 42nd Infantry Regiment and the incomplete guard battalion No. 33. Other sub-units were added, Infantry arrived from near Wizna were gathered as well as two squadrons of the 2nd Grochow Uhlan Regiment from Suwałki. The units created defensive line along Dojlidy and Nowe Miasto, through Wysoki Stoczek, to Pietraszi: Uhlans from two squadrons of the 2nd Regiment were placed in Białostoczek and Pietrasze, guard battalion No. 32 was deployed in Nowe Miasto, and the center of defense was the hills of Wysokie Stoczek manned by the marching battalion of the 42nd Infantry Regiment commanded by Lieutenant Ignacy Stachowiak. In addition, the city's defenders were supported by a company of heavy machine guns and one artillery platoon. In total, the order of battle numbered around 900 soldiers.

Combat contact with German troops was established on 13 September near Żółtki, and on 15 September in the morning, the Germans stormed the central section of Polish positions in the Marczuk and Wysoki Stoczek districts. The opponent's advantage was devastating. K. Kosiński died and buried in St. Roch's cemetery. After several hours of persistent defense and repulsion of four German attacks, first two squadrons of the 2nd Grochów Regiment, then the 42nd Regiment companies retreated towards the city, and after a short rest left in the evening further east towards Wołkowysk (following the war it was transferred to Byelorussian SSR).

On 15 September, Białystok was occupied by the "Lötzen" Fortress Brigade under the command of General Otto-Ernst Ottenbacher. Two days later, on 17 September, Soviet troops joined them. On 20–21 September, the German Einsatzgruppe IV entered the city to commit crimes against the population.

==== Soviet occupation ====
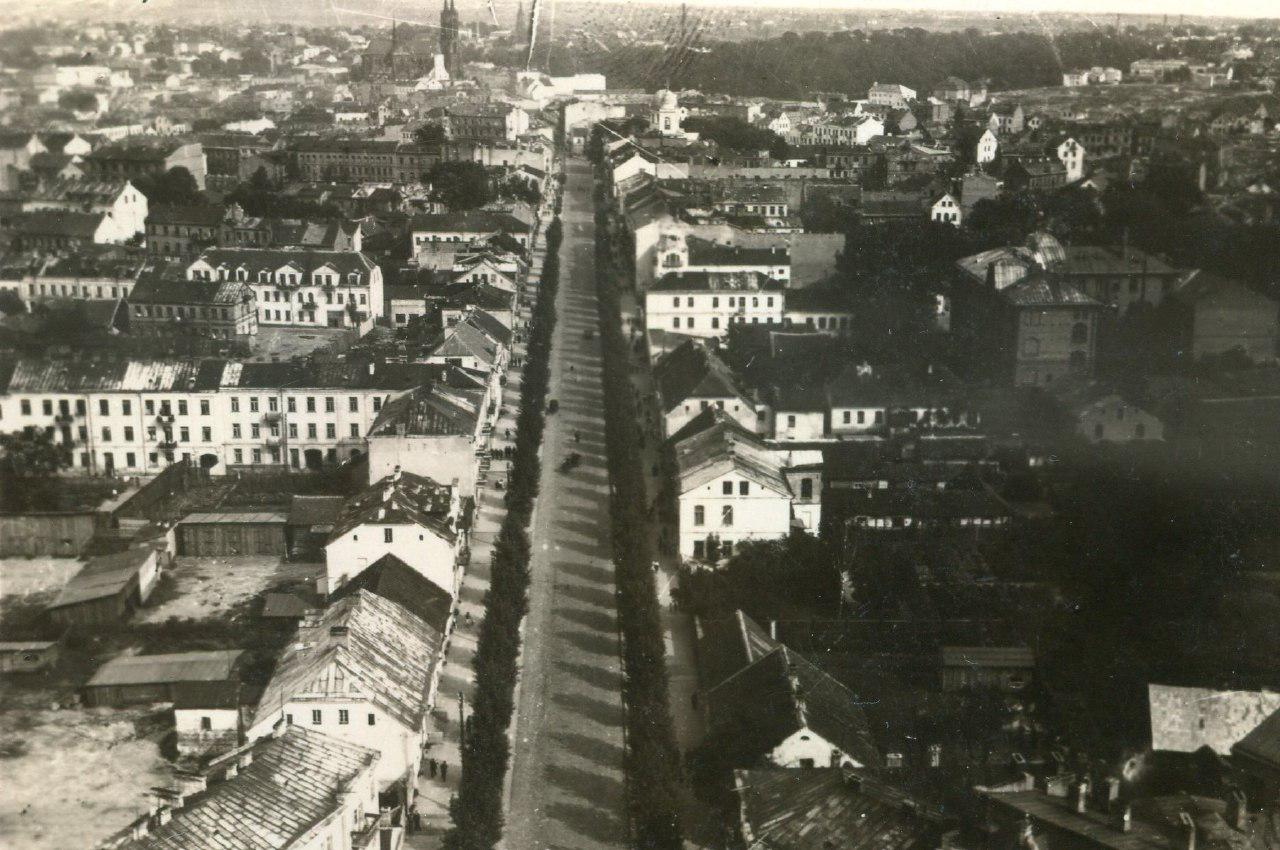
View on the city center and Lipowa Street in 1940 when the city was occupied by the Soviet Union

On 20–22 September, discussions were held at the Branicki Palace regarding the transfer of the city from German to Soviet hands. According to the agreement, the Wehrmacht was to leave the city until 22 September by 14:00. At the conclusion of the negotiations, the delegations went to a dinner in Ritz Hotel. And so, on 22 September, a ceremony of handing over the city was held at the courtyard of the Branicki Palace with the participation of Ivan Boldin who was the commander of the Cavalry-Mechanized Group in the Belarusian Military District and Andrey Yeremenko who was the commander of the 6th Cavalry Corps. The Germans handed over power to the Soviets and withdrew. The city passed to the Soviet Union with respect to the secret protocol of the Molotov–Ribbentrop pact.

NKVD set up its office in Białystok, which occupied the building of the District Court in 5 Mieczkiewica Street. Among the victims of the arrests wave were employees of the District Court who were arrested such as Józef Ostruszka, the last president of the court (he was imprisoned in Bialystok, then expelled with others to Soviet camps), Vice President Karol Wolisz, Jan Bolesław Stokowski who chief secretary of the regional court and head of the Tax office. The People's Assembly of Białystok met on 28–30 October in Białystok under the slogan: "death to the white eagle". The NKVD also took over the local prison. In October, the NKVD arrested pre-war Polish mayor Seweryn Nowakowski, who was then probably deported to the USSR, however his fate remains unknown.

On 22 October 1939, less than two weeks after the invasion, the Soviet occupation administration organized elections into a National assembly of West Belarus (Belarusian: Народны сход Заходняй Беларусі). The official turnout was 96.7 percent, and 90 percent of the vote was given to candidates backed by the Soviet Union. The Elections to the People's Assemblies of Western Ukraine and Western Belarus took place under control of NKVD and the Communist Party. On 30 October the National Assembly session held in Białystok passed the decision of so-called West Belarus joining the USSR and its unification with the Belarusian Soviet Socialist Republic. These petitions were officially accepted by the Supreme Soviet of the USSR on 2 November and by the Supreme Soviet of the Byelorussian SSR on 12 November. The Belastok Voblast with the center in Białystok was created in 1939.

Following the incorporation of Białystok and the surroundings as Belastok Region in the Belarusian SSR, a policy of Sovietization began. In 1940 the town hall and the city scales' building were demolished to provide a large space for holding rallies and demonstrations. The square was decorated with eye-catching, red posters. At Sovietskaya Street (Kościuszko Market Square) 27 the Gorky District Library replaced the City Public Library. Semyon Igayev was appointed to the secretary of Białystok's Obkom, a former Second Secretary of Mogilev Obkom. The NKVD established its headquarters at Mickiewicza Street at the now Voivodeship Office. The first head of the provincial NKVD was Alexander Misiuriev who was later replaced by Peter Gladkov and Sergei Bielchenko. The Gorkom (city council) was located at 21 Warszawska Street, in a non-existing building. Grisha Gershman was appointed to the first secretary of the Party City Committee.

After being annexed to the Soviet Union, thousands of ethnic Poles, Belarusians and Jews, were forcibly deported to Siberia by the NKVD, which resulted in over 100,000 people deported to eastern parts of the USSR. Among the deported Poles were civil servants, judges, police officers, professional army officers, factory owners, landlords, political activists, leaders of cultural, educational and religious organizations, and other activists in the community. All of them were dubbed enemies of the people.

The inclusion of Białystok in the BSSR, apart from the large influx of people from the USSR, created the conditions for the migration of people from the surrounding towns, including many local Belarusians to the city, probably mainly to improve the ethnic base for exercising power in the city. The process of institutionalization of Belarusians and Belarusian culture took place in the city on a larger scale: Among others Belarusian schools, pedagogical institute with the Belarusian language faculty and Belarusian theater were set up in the city. During this period there was a change in ethnic stratification in the city. Poles lost their dominant significance.

The Polish resistance movement was active in the city, which was the seat of one of the six main commands of the Union of Armed Struggle in occupied Poland (alongside Warsaw, Kraków, Poznań, Toruń and Lwów). The resistance in the area of Białystok (especially along the swampy Biebrza river) began immediately after the September Campaign and in mid-1940 there were conspiratorial organizations in 161 towns and villages in the future area of Bezirk Bialystok. Białystok native and future President of Poland in exile Ryszard Kaczorowski was a member of the local Polish resistance and was arrested in the city by the NKVD in 1940. Initially the Soviets sentenced him to death, but eventually he was sentenced to 10 years in forced labor camps and deported to Kolyma, from where he was released in 1942, when he joined the Anders' Army.

==== German occupation ====
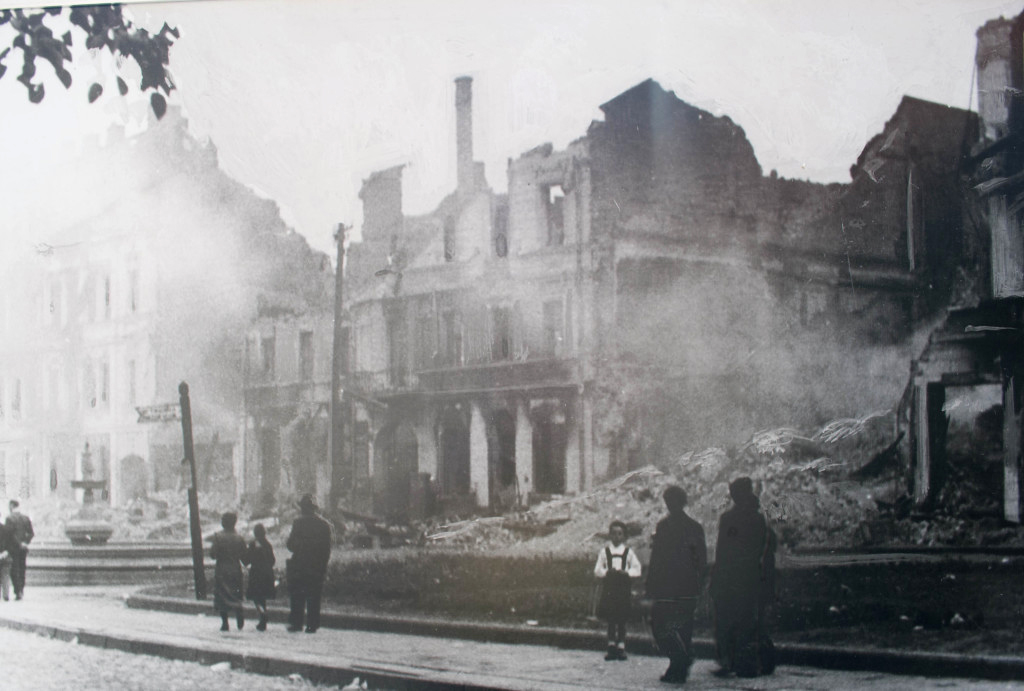
Ruined buildings under German occupation

In the aftermath of the June 1941 Battle of Białystok–Minsk, part of the German attack on the Soviet Union, Białystok was placed under German Civilian Occupation (Zivilverwaltungsgebiet) as Bezirk Bialystok. The area was under German rule from 1941 to 1944/45, without ever formally being incorporated into the German Reich.

On June 22, 1941, without any declaration of war, Nazi Germany attacked the USSR. On June 22, early in the morning, the branch of the Białystok District of the Communist Party of Byelorussia met. At the meeting, a decision was made to appoint an extraordinary commission for the evacuation of military families, civilians and secret documentation. The head of the NKGB established two subversive and spy groups. They were to constitute the core of the Soviet partisans. However, on June 23, the Soviet occupation authorities decided to evacuate from Białystok.

It has been established that at the beginning on 22 June 1941 the withdrawing Soviet troops, that were forced out by the German army, committed regular crimes against the inhabitants of Białystok and its area. Civilians who happened to be in the vicinity of the passing Soviet troops were shot dead. There were cases of the whole families being dragged out of their houses and executed by firing squads in Białystok and the areas surrounding.

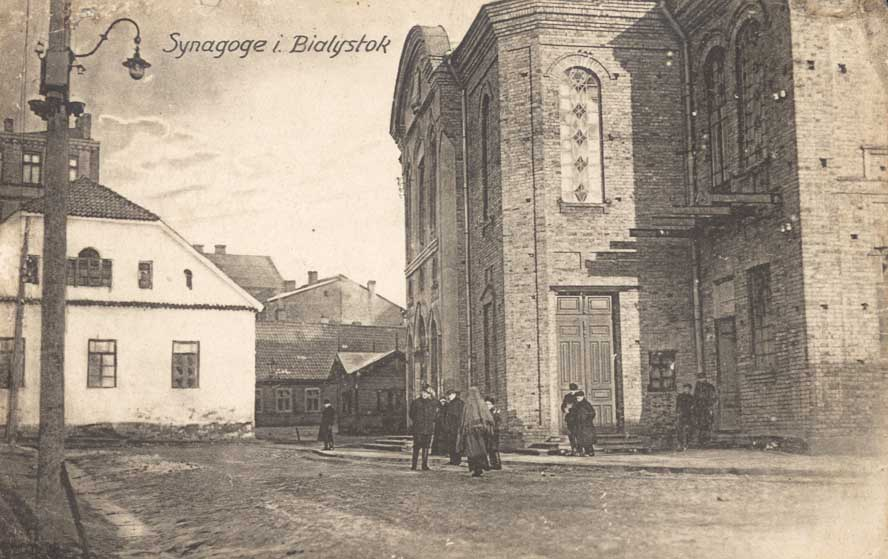
Great Synagogue in Białystok

On the morning of 27 June 1941, troops from Police Battalion 309 of the Order Police surrounded the town square by the Great Synagogue, the largest wooden synagogue in Eastern Europe, and forced residents from their homes into the street. Some were shoved up against building walls and shot dead. Others– some 800 men, women and children– were locked in the synagogue, which was subsequently set on fire; there they were burned to death. The Nazi onslaught continued with the demolition of numerous homes and further shootings. As the flames from the synagogue spread and merged with the grenade fires, the entire square was engulfed. Some 3,000 Jews died that day (27 June 1941), out of an estimated population of 50,000 Jews living in the city at that time.

As the time went by, German terror in Bezirk Bialystok worsened and most atrocities on civilian population were committed by German units and police from neighboring East Prussia. The Gestapo headquarters was located at 15 Sienkiewicza Street. During the German occupation, a mass murder of Poles in the Bacieczkowski Forest (today lying on the border of Starosielce, Leśna Dolina and Bacieczki districts) was carried out by the Germans. In 1943, the German occupiers shot several hundred representatives of the Białystok intelligentsia: Germans placed men, women and children in ditches and shot them with automatic weapons. In July and August 1943, several hundred doctors, lawyers, priests, teachers, officials, students and pupils were killed. This crime deprived Białystok of much of its pre-war intelligentsia. A monument was erected in the site in 1980.

The Germans operated a Nazi prison in the city, and a forced labour camp for Jewish men. Since 1943, the Sicherheitspolizei carried out deportations of Poles including teenage boys from the local prison to the Stutthof concentration camp.

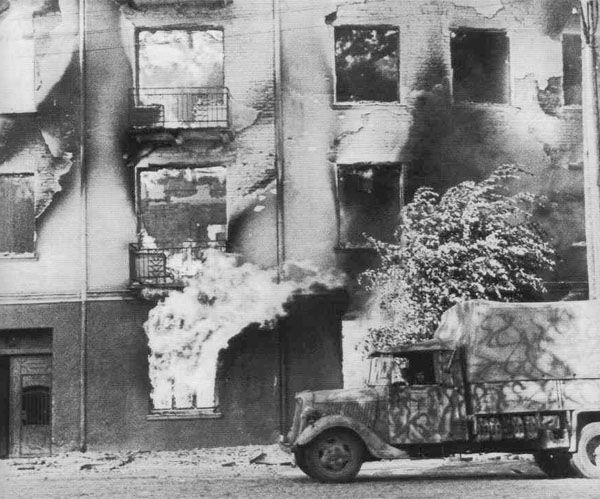
Soviet bombing damages in German occupied Białystok in 1944

In July 1943, the Uderzeniowe Bataliony Kadrowe (UBK) units, active in Bezirk Bialystok, consisted of five Battalions. Altogether, there were 200 fighters, and during a number of skirmishes with the Germans (including the Raid on Mittenheide in 1943), 138 of them were killed. These heavy losses were criticized by the headquarters of the Home Army, who claimed that the UBK was profusely using lives of young Polish soldiers. On 17 August 1943, upon the order of General Tadeusz Bor-Komorowski, the UBK was included into the Home Army. Soon afterwards, all battalions were transferred to the area of Nowogródek.

From the very beginning, the Nazis pursued a ruthless policy of pillage and removal of the non-German population. The 56,000 Jewish residents of the town were confined in a ghetto. On 15 August 1943, the Białystok Ghetto Uprising began, and several hundred Polish Jews and members of the Anti-Fascist Military Organisation (Polish: Antyfaszystowska Organizacja Bojowa) started an armed struggle against the German troops who were carrying out the planned liquidation of the ghetto.

In the last year of the occupation, a clandestine upper Commercial School came into existence. The pupils of the school also took part in the underground resistance movement. As a result, some of them were jailed, some killed and others deported to Nazi concentration camps.

A number of anti-fascist groups came into existence in Białystok during the first weeks of the occupation. In the following years, there developed a well-organized resistance movement.

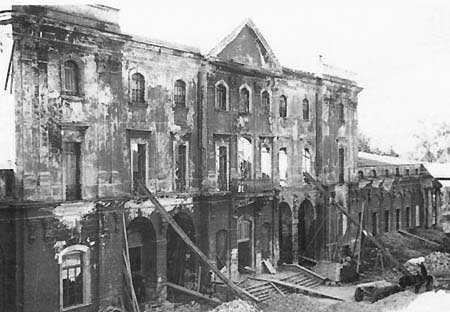
Branicki Palace destroyed by Germans in 1944

In the summer of 1944, heavy Soviet Forces pushed into the region as part of the Belostok Offensive: The 3rd Army managed to reach the outskirts of Białystok and even though encountered strong resistance from the LV Corps, stormed and took control of the city by 27 July after several days of street fighting. While the Wehrmacht were retreating from the Soviet Armed Forces troops approaching Bialystok, its soldiers began the systematic destruction of the city with almost all the tenements and houses in the downtown, the Branicki Palace, the Teachers' Seminary buildings, all the most important local and state buildings, industrial and production facilities, a new viaduct built just before the war were set on fire on Dąbrowskiego street, barracks of the 42nd Infantry Regiment and the 10th Lithuanian Uhlan Regiment in Wygoda district, Ritz Hotel, hospital buildings and a power plant.

=== Early post war years and re-joining Poland (1944–1948) ===
On July 20, 1944, before the Red Army entered Białystok, at the headquarters of the Białystok inspector Major Władysław Kaufman at 15 Wiktorii street in Białystok, a briefing for unit commanders from the city was held, during which the orders of the district commander regarding the Operation Tempest were discussed once again. Combat tasks were to be carried out by commanders at the appropriate levels, and consisted in eliminating the Germans by all means. Germans began to systematically destroy the city center. First of all, it began with the main streets, three-story tenement houses, many of them owned by Jews. The streets: Lipowa, Sienkiewicza, Kupiecka, Zamenhoffa, Równoległa and others were burning. The last troops destroying the city withdrew 26 July in the afternoon, when the Red Army was already visible on the outskirts of Białystok. The destruction of the city was completed by two-day (25 and 26 July) artillery fire.

Just before the Soviets took over Białystok, the commander of Białystok District of the Home Army, Colonel Władysław Liniarski assigned the city inspector Major and deputy commander of the district Władysław Kaufman a new task consisting in conducting talks with the Soviet authorities: They concerned two issues: reaching an agreement with representatives of the Soviet side on the creation of a 100,000 Polish army corps from the inhabitants of the Białystok region and demand from the Soviet authorities that the areas east of the Curzon Line are part of the Polish state and cannot be incorporated into the USSR.

On July 27, 1944, Soviet troops entered Białystok. People's Commissariat for State Security (NKGB) of the BSSR took the building at the 2 Sobieskiego street while SMERSH was located at 26 Słonimska street and 66 Boboli street. In the morning of the next day, the Home Army intelligence reported that the representative and minister of the Byelorussi SSR, in the rank of a colonel of the NKVD, had officially visited Father Aleksandr Chodyko in Białystok, stating that Białystok was the capital of Western Belarus. In the same day the Home Army Białystok city commander-inspector Władysław Kaufman went together with delegate of the government-in-exile and voivode Józef Przybyszewski for a meeting with the Soviet city commandant general Lieutenant Piotr Sobienikov at its headquarters at 35 Mickiewicza street. After an hour of waiting a Soviet delegation of several people appeared, including: general Pyotr Sobennikov, a NKVD general, four officers from the staffs front armies and two ministers of the government of Western Belarus. The Soviet side declared that Przybyszewski has no right to organize and local administration as according to the vote held in October 1939 the city became part of the Byelorussian SSR.

The party activists and partisans who carried out the orders of the Central Committee of the Communist Party of Byelorussia did not know on the preliminary border agreement concluded on 25 July, according to which Stalin confirmed to the representatives of the Polish Committee of National Liberation his decision to transfer Poland to Białystok and Łomża. It was based on these decisions that on 27 July in the afternoon a delegation of the Polish National Liberation Committee arrived at the Białystok-Krywlany Airport to take over the city from Soviet hands. The delegation included: Edwarda Orłowska, who had appoint the Polish Workers' Party apparatus, Colonel Tadeusz Paszta, responsible for organizing the Office of Security and Civic Militia, and Zygmunt Zieliński with a team of 12 soldiers, appoint and fill Ministry of Defense powiat headquarters. The day after, they were joined by Major Leonard Borkowicz and the designated Wojewoda Jerzy Sztachelski who were representatives of the Polish Committee of National Liberation in the Białystok Province.

In the first days of August, Soviet activists were ordered to leave the lands which became part of 'Lublin Poland'. After arriving in Grodno they recreated however, the Białystok Regional Executive Committee (Polish: Białostocki obwodowy komitet wykonawczy). The final decision about its liquidation occurred in December 1944.

==== Political situation ====
From 28 July, every day, Soviet soldiers also ran raids in the city to recruit men to work filling the pits at the bombed airport and building fortifications on the outskirts of the city. In August, the first militia units helped them. In addition, after the end of the work, forced meetings took place, at which the new authorities indoctrinated, vigorously criticizing the Polish government-in-exile and the Home Army.

On 30 July 1944, PKWN activists posted appeals in the city informing that PKWN activists are the only legal authority in the city. The Polish government-in-exile represented by voivode Józef Przybyszewski and the president of Białystok Ryszard Gołębiowski, who revealed themselves to the Soviets as representatives of the legal Polish authorities and offered cooperation. On 2 of August Przybyszewski appointed Gołębiowski to the interim president of Białystok. On 3 August, militiamen and Kościuszko soldiers on the order of the Polish Committee of National Liberation made the first attempt to disband the City Council appointed by the Government Delegate. On 7 August NKVD arrested Przybyszewski at the next meeting of the Government Delegate. On the same day, the Soviet military commander of Białystok invited president of Białystok, Ryszard Gołębiowski for talks. General Sobiennikov banned the distribution of summonses and leaflets, and demanded that Gołębiowski make the Home Army soldiers surrender their weapons. Following the conversation, Gołębiowski left the Soviet command building, but the next day he was arrested by NKVD officers and deported to Kharkiv and from there sent to Camp 170 Dyagilevo next to Ryazan. While Gołębiowski was allowed to return to Poland in 1947, Przybyszewski died in the Soviet Union. NKVD in consultation with PKWN activists proceeded to the final hearing with the Polish Underground State and its legal representatives.

Soviet authorities deported from the Central Prison in Kopernika street nearly 5,000 anti-communist underground soldiers to the Soviet Union, from the summer of 1944 to the end of 1945. In 1944–1955, military courts in the Bialystok region sentenced over 550 people to death, of whom about 320 were murdered. At the first meeting of the Municipal National Council (Polish: Miejska Rada Narodowa) in Bialystok on 31 August 1944, by an election resolution of the council as chairman the council was elected Witold Wenclik, and vice-chairmen Józef Jankowski and Jan Pietkiewicz. On 30 May, Andrzej Krzewniak was appointed to that position (Przewodniczący MRN) and served until 1948. In parallel to the existence of Soviet security forces such as NKVD and SMERSH, the security apparatus of the Polish communist authorities began forming in the city with the establishment of territorial branches of the various security and intelligence agencies such as the Ministry of Public Security such as WUBP at the voivodeship level, headquartered from 1946 to 1956 at 3 Mickiewicza Street, PUBP at the county level headquartered at 7 Warszawska street from 1945 to 1956 and MUBP at the municipal level, headquartered at 2 Staszica (then Monopolowa) street and headed by Piotr Grzymajło from 14 September 1944 to January 1946 when it was abolished. Executions took place in seats of those organizations as well as in the Central Prison, Solnicki Forest, the military training ground at Zielona near Białystok (located at 53°08′50″N 23°16′53″E), the KBW shooting range at Pietrasze Forest (located at 53°10′17″N 23°09′49″E), and the military shooting range at the barracks on 100 Bema Street.

==== Economic situation ====
Alongside with political consolidation, the economic situation in the city was harsh, with shortages in most basic products. On 31 August 1944 the Municipal National Council ordered not tom issue food stamps to city residents (aged 17 to 55) who do not appear at the behest of the authorities to work on rebuilding the city. At the next meeting of the Municipal National Council, on 12 October 1944, it was decided that only employees would receive food stamps. Their family members were to remain without food allowances. Also, heavy taxation on all spheres of life: By resolution of the City Council, public games, entertainment events, and signboards and posters were taxed. A hotel tax was introduced, the land tax was increased by half, additional taxes were introduced for the production and sale of alcohol products. The consumption tax was introduced in mass catering establishments by key: from 7.00 to 19.00 -10% on the bill amount, from 19.00 to 21.00 – 20%, from 21.00 to the morning – 50%. Market fees and fees for the use of electricity and water were increased.

==== Culture and media ====
The authorities began working on return to normalization and the process saw the rapid launch of the Polish radio in the city and the opening, despite enormous housing and financial problems, of the Municipal Theater and the Library. To run megaphone city information, an old Soviet production amplifier donated by one of the Soviet commanders and surviving fragments of an overhead telephone line running from Warszawska street towards Kościuszko Market Square and Mickiewicza street. The beginning of the network was a line specially made for the needs of the Gestapo, which Soviet soldiers did not steal. Lack of wires was supplemented, large Soviet megaphone loudspeakers (so-called gromkogoworitel) were mounted on lighting poles. They were located on the corner of Sienkiewicza, Pałacowa and Warszawska streets (not far from the ruins of the Branicki Palace), Świętojańska and Mickiewicza, and at Kościuszko Market Square. The whole base of the first radio was located in the building at Warszawska 13 St. Of course, it wasn't then we were talking about broadcasting any radio programs, because Polish Radio as such practically nonexistent. Megaphones were used for propaganda and information purposes.

After the securing of the city, during the Belostock Offensive of Operation Bagration, by the Soviet army on 27 July 1944, it was administered by the Byelorussian SSR as the capital of the restored Belastok Voblast. With the Border Agreement between Poland and the USSR of 16 August 1945, Białystok, with the surrounding area, was passed on to the People's Republic of Poland.

=== Polish People's Republic ===
==== Early years ====
Białystok was, from 1945 until 1975, the capital city of the Białystok Voivodeship. After the 1975 administrative reorganization of the People's Republic of Poland, the city was the capital of the smaller Białystok Voivodeship which lasted until 1998.

After the incorporation to the People's Republic of Poland, the formation of Białystok downtown (both restoration and redevelopment) took place under the influence of the architectural school of Tadeusz Tołwiński, whose student Ignacy Felicjan Tłoczek together with Stefan Zieliński were the authors of the general city plan of Bialystok which was approved in 1948. The works were preceded by a conference organized by the Ministry of Reconstruction and the Voivodeship of Białystok. The work lasted between May and December 1948. Another important general plan was drawn on behalf of the Spatial Regional Planning Directorate (Polish: Regionalna Dyrekcja Planowania Przestrzennego) by architects Stanisław Bukowski, Leszek Dąbrowski, Ignacy Tłoczek and Stefan Zieliński.

The plans assumed that by 1979 the city will have around 200,000 residents. The development direction was directed towards Supraśl definitely against previous trends in the development of the eastern part of the city. Establishment of a river port, sewage collector and main transportation route, which was to be the basis for using the potential of the river valley. In the Jurowiec area, a river port with a nuisance industry center was planned based on the railway line leading there to Ełk. This center was to constitute the northwestern edge of the urban area. The Biała river valley was adopted as the basis for the directional development of the city (starting from Dojlid and ending at its mouth). The southern and western barriers to the city's development were to be forest areas, the Krywlany Airfield and the swampy areas of Dojlidy. It was anticipated that in the west the city should not go beyond Słoboda (today's Nowe Miasto) and Starosielce-Bażantarnia to the north-east.

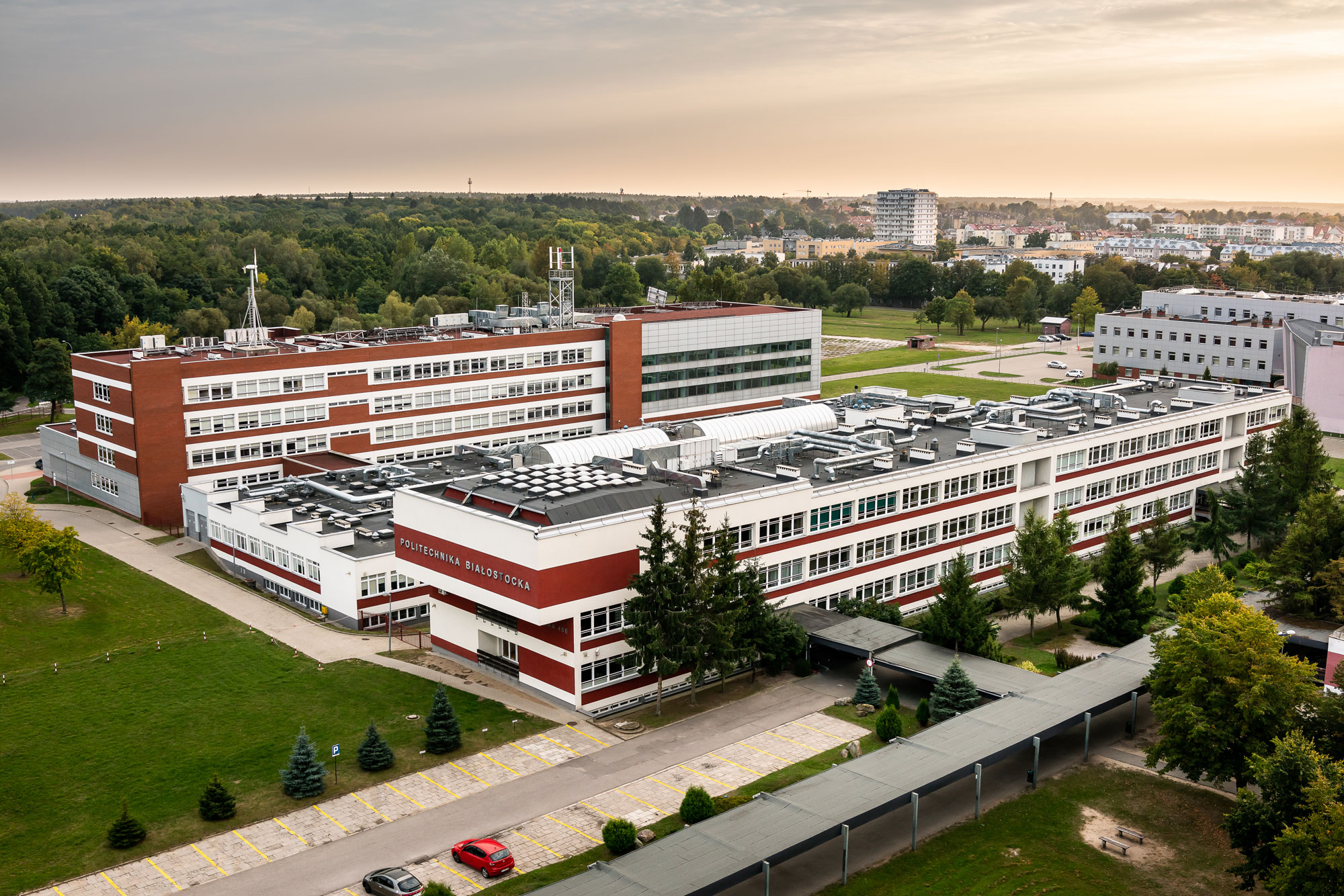
Białystok University of Technology

The districts were divided into functional zones: Administrative and cultural center located on the baroque axis of Branicki Palace and the two streets perpendicular to it: Warszawska and Piwna (Skłodowska-Curei). A shopping and offices center located between Lipowa and Sienkiewicza streets. Industrial center in Antoniuk and Fabryczna Station and Nowe Miasto and residential districts located in Antoniuk, Bojary on the right side of the Biala river and Piaski on the left bank of the Biala River. Recreation areas in the form of a forest in Pieczurki and Białostoczek, green areas along the Biała River.

The city center was according to the plan the main transportation axis (current Piłsudskiego Avenue and Branickiego Street) and an administrative center. An important component of the reconstruction of the city center envisaged the moving of the core of the new city center away from the historical Kościuszko Market Square to the newly built 1989 Square. The House of the Party was constructed at the square with the Skłodowskiej-Curie Avenue which would act as "representative" avenue, stretching to the south from the square and will contain important public buildings. Kalinowskiego and Liniarskiego streets were created as well to connect the square to Lipowa Street. An important element in the planning of the city center after the war was the creation of "Parade Avenue", a representative thoroughfare. The shape was defined by Stanisław Bukowski in 1950. As part of this plan, Skłodowskiej-Curie Street (then called Aleje Pochodow "Parade Avenue"). The street was designed to be constitute a new, representative axis of a socialist city. Along the street a number of important representative public buildings were built, such as the building number 1 (District Court), number 3 (House of the Unions Polish: Dom Związkowca), number 23 (The Actor's House), (Polish: Dom Aktora).

Originally in place of the Central Department Store it was planned to construct the seat for the Presidium of the Voivodeship National Council. Also, different plans called for a set of administrative buildings with the Voivodeship and the City Council at the head, as well as the central post office and cinema (called also Centrum II), at the intersection of Skłodowskiej-Curie, Waszyngtona and Legionow streets. However, this part of the plan was never materialized.

In parallel to the representative administrative area, a new residential area was constructed, bounded between Lipowa and Sienkiewicza streets and Piłsudskiego avenue, called ZOR district (Polish: Osiedle ZOR) acronym which stands for Union of Workers' Organizations (Polish: Zjednoczenie Organizacji Robotniczych). This neighbourhood was built on the ruins of the streets that marked the old city of Białystok and were part of the ghetto. The plan called for 3 to 4 floor apartment buildings built in modernist style with vaulted roofs to add some elegance and public buildings interspersed between them.

=== 1956 uprising and Gomulka thaw ===
The next day, young employees met at a joint meeting in the Fasty factory and Zambrowskie Zakłady Włókiennicze. A letter was sent to the 8th Plenum of the Central Committee of the Polish United Workers' Party, in which Gomułka's policy was supported. The party was also asked to take into account the voice of young people. In next days the rallies took place at the Railway Steel Structures Plant in Starosielce, the Municipal Building Enterprise (Kombinat Budowlany), the Instrument and Handle Factory, the Roasting Plant (Białostockie Zakłady Roszarnicze w Wysokim Stoczku), the Road Equipment Repair Plant, the Plush Factory. Resolutions were adopted everywhere in which the crews supported policy of Gomułka. It was also requested to rename Stalina Street. The members of Kolejowe Zakłady Konstrukcji Stalowych in suggested giving it the name of the Avenue of Polish-Soviet Friendship (Polish: Przyjaźni Polsko-Radzieckiej) to commemorate the brotherhood of arms. On the other hand, employees of the State Forests submitted a request that the street be named October 21. At workplaces, journalists were accused of hindering development workers' self-government.

On 20 October 1956, people of Białystok gathered at the radios and listened to the speech of Władysław Gomułka delivered at the 8th Plenum of the Central Committee of the PZPR. A declaration of loyalty was published in Gazeta Białostocka from 23 October which emphasized the population of the Białystok Voivodeship together with the entire Polish nation strongly supports the new leadership of the party in the implementation of the program outlined on the VIII Plenum. The next day around 15,000 people gathered in the courtyard of the Branicki Palace (seat of the Medical University of Białystok). First, the speeches of local PUWP leaders were heard, and then through the radio of Władysław Gomułka's speech Speaking representatives of the workplace strongly criticized the provincial state and party authorities. The first secretary of the communist party in the city, Jan Jabłoński even submitted a public resignation, which was later rejected by the executive committee of the PZPR. Trade union banners were present at the rally, and so was the rally led by the secretary of the Provincial Council of Trade Unions, Franciszek Lesner. A letter of the Executive of the PZPR Municipal Committee was read out to members of the party and society of the Bialystok Voivodeship. At some point, however, the situation began to get out of control. On a student came in to the rostrum and demanded that Rokossowskiego Street be changed to Aleje Akademicka. Harsh words of criticism were expressed regarding the Polish-Soviet friendship. There was talk of subordination of Poland to the Soviet Union. People began to demand that the alliance with the Soviet be broken, the political system liberalized and living conditions improved. At some point two cars filled with the army pulled up to the Voivodeship Committee. An officer jumped out of one of them and began to provide demonstrators that the army is with the nation, supports the policy of Władysław Gomułka and the 8th Plenum of the Central Committee of the Polish United Workers' Party. He also stated that it was time to end the subordination of the Polish People's Army to Soviet officers who issued all commands in Russian. After the officer's speech, the soldiers jumped out of the cars and mixed with the crowd. Stanisław Kudła (secretary of the Polish United Workers' Party) came to the window and called on the protesters to prudence and go home but they continued to give speeches until midnight.

After the rally, some of the participants went home, but several thousand people mainly students and young workers walked through Lipowa Street towards the Church of St. Rocha. The demonstrators carried national flags as well as the Hungarian flag as a sign of support for the Hungarian uprising. When they reached the church of St. Rocha Father Adam Abramowicz asked for a peaceful departure.

At the meeting of the Executive of the Municipal Committee of the PZPR, which met On 25 October 1956, Kazimierz Ornat and Secretary of the City Committee PZPR stated that the demonstration took place in front of the PZPR Voivodeship Committee building was anti-Soviet, anti-state and anti-party. Gomułka supporters planned to write an open letter; Stanisław Kosicki, the editor-in-chief of Gazeta Białostocka, did not sign it. He considered the open letter to be harmful and, if published, threatened to resign. After publishing the letter, he resigned from managing Gazeta Białostocka. Kazimierz Nowak took his place, and Edward Pajkert became his deputy.

The October 1956 uprising which occurred in Poznan had influence on the Political situation in the country and led to the departure of the local party secretary, Jan Jabłoński, who resigned, again, on 31 October, and this time his resignation was accepted by the provincial authorities. Antoni Laskowski, a local party activist who was not imposed by the Central Committee for the first time, was entrusted with the function of the First Secretary of the Polish United Workers' Party, though this not for long, as after 3 weeks he was ousted by Gomułka. His place was taken by Arkadiusz Łaszewicz.

=== 1960s–1970s ===
Throughout the 50s and 60s the fast growth of the city and its reconstruction from the damages of the war continued. The construction of the viaduct at Dąbrowskiego Street began, and the next year the W-Z route called Aleja 1 Maja (in 1990 it was renamed as Józef Piłsudskiego Avenue). In 1959 the Housing Cooperative 'Rodzina Kolejowa' in Przydworcowe district was completed. Also, The number of inhabitants of Białystok increased, which in the late 1950s became demographically one of the most dynamically developing Polish cities. In 1956, this number exceeded 100,000 people. The main reason for such rapid demographic development was the migration from smaller towns and villages of the region.

Despite intensive development, in 1968 Białystok did not form a compact one urban complex. Districts: Wygoda, Pieczurki, Skorupy, Dojlidy, Słoboda (future district of Nowe Miasto), Marczuk, Wysoki Stoczek and Dziesięciny kept in their arrangement and layout of rural character. In the city's long-term development plans, transformation was envisaged:

From the end of the 50s Bialystok saw massive construction of housing estates. Rodzina Kolejowa was inaugurated in 1959 and the 60s saw the construction of the Tysiąclecie housing estate. Between 1960 and 1965 mass housing estate was built in Antoniuk District. Late 60s and early 70s saw the construction of Przyjaźń, and Białostoczek housing estates as well as Dziesięciny I and II. The 80s saw the construction of Słoneczny Stok, Zielone Wzgórza and Nowe Miasto housing estates. In the decades after the war, as part of the massive re-construction and development efforts which followed the mass destruction, large number of pre-war streets were erased from the map during the demolishing and construction and widening of new streets. Among them are Siedlecka, Cicha, Orlańska, Piesza, Szlachecka, Mińska, Syjońska, Palestyńska, Jasna, Chazanowicza, Kacza, Kosynierska, Różańska, Chmielna, Chmielna, Górna, Smolna, Łódzka, Niecala, Smutna, Rabińska, Chazanowicza, Tykocińska, Jastrzębia, Dobrzyniewska, Alta, Sportowa, Koszarowa, Zamkowa, Fastowska, Ciemna, Widna, Głucha, Zalewna, Mokra, Gęsia, Fastowska, Bożnicza, Szkolna, Ceglana, Ordynarska, Stolarska, Czackiego, Alejowa, Skidelska, Indurska, Sienna, Berdyczowska, Wołkowyska, Książęca, Wronia, Okrągła, Grzybowa, Okopowa, Wisniowa and Mazurska.

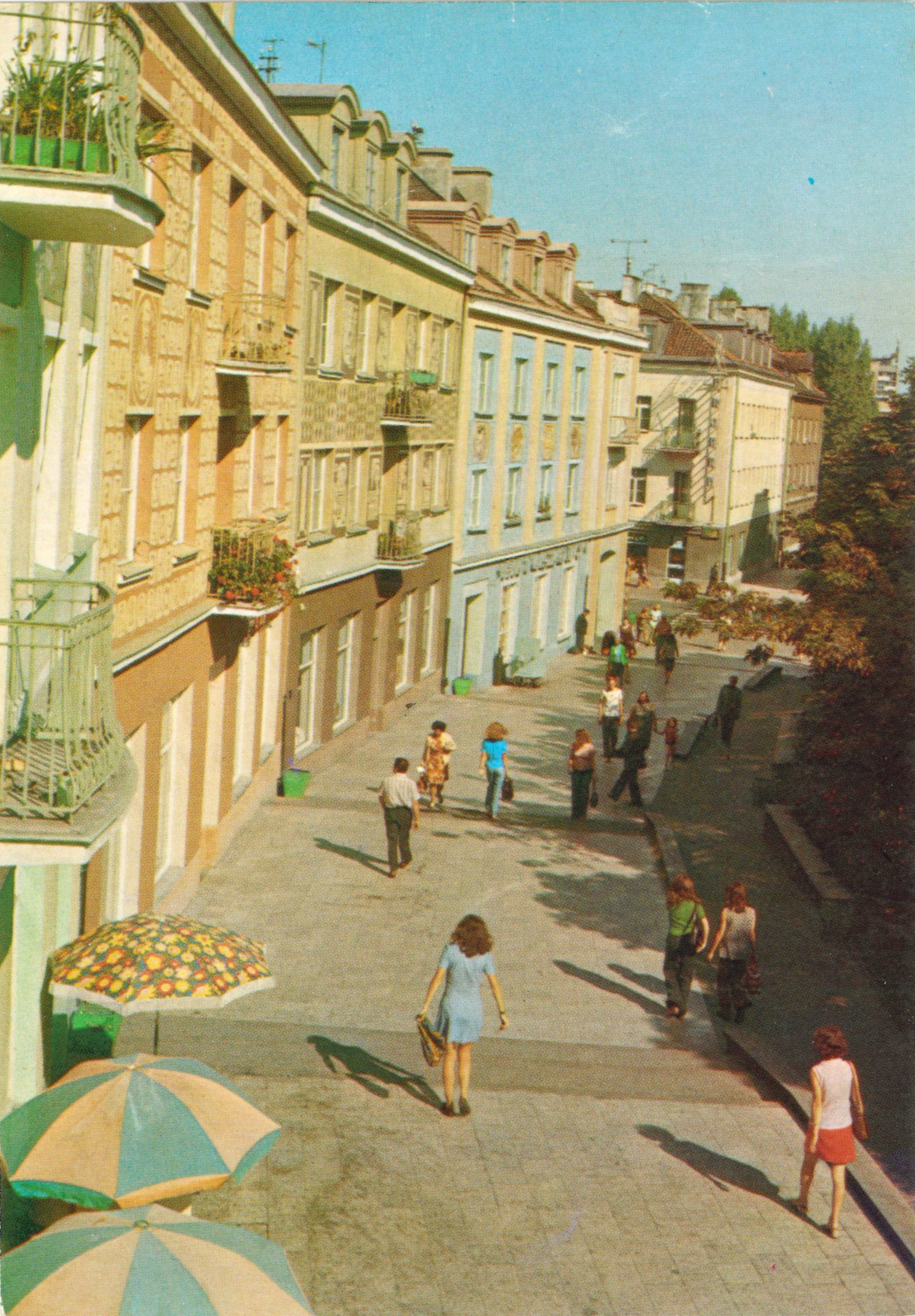
View of Kościuszko Market Square in Białystok in the 1970s

In 1968, a branch of the University of Warsaw was established (in 1997 it received independence and named University of Białystok), as well as the Army Museum. In 1973, as part of preparations for the Central Harvest Ceremonies which were held in the city, a number of large infrastructure projects completed in the city. The Sienny Market Square was rebuilt, and the transportation hub at the intersection of Zwycięstwa, Hetmańska, and Gagarina Streets (now Solidarity Avenue) was opened. New pavilions and exhibition facilities were built, including the "Spodki" (Saucers) at the foot of St. Roch Hill. The "Gwardia" stadium was modernized, and construction of an amphitheater began. An agricultural exhibition was held on an 8-hectare site. The road connecting Białystok with Warsaw was thoroughly modernized, with the road surface being leveled and bus bays being built. Construction of the amphitheater and the "Central" Department Store began, on the top of the existing Merkury, Nowy, Sezam, Delikatesy stores. In 1974, the Puppetry Department of the State Higher School of Theater named after Aleksander Zelwerowicz opened, as well as a branch of the Warsaw Chopin Music Academy. The Symphony Orchestra received the status of a philharmonic, and a year later a new seat.

At the end of the 1970s, nearly four-fifths of the voivodeship's industrial production was concentrated in Białystok, accounting for 80% of the voivodeship's industrial employment. In Białystok, as in the voivodeship, the main industries were light industry (textile factories, haberdashery shops, and a carpet factory) and agri-food (dairies, a brewery, fruit and vegetable processing plants, mills, and feed factories). The electromechanical and precision industries emerged, primarily through cooperation with other industrial plants across the country. The timber industry also played a significant role, including sawmills, furniture factories, panel factories, plywood factories, and a construction joinery factory. Small or medium-sized plants dominated in Białystok, compared to other regions of Poland. There was a lack of large factories such as the Katowice Steelworks or the Passenger Car Factory in Žerań, etc. Białystok had no workplace with a large and strong working class. The largest plant in the voivodeship, the Białystok Cotton Industry Plant "Fasty" employed approximately 6,000 workers, the vast majority of whom were women. One of the most modern enterprises in Białystok was the Białystok Television Component Plant "Unitra-Biazet". Despite dynamic expansion (the city had one of the highest percentages of new construction in the country, and approximately 70% of Białystok's residents lived in post-war apartments), Białystok experienced a significant housing shortage.

In 1980, Białystok was one of fifteen cities in Poland with a population exceeding 200,000, which constituted a third of the voivodeship's population and 64.3% of the voivodeship's urban population.

==== Martial law ====
The network of Solidarity branches of the key factories of Poland was created on 14 April 1981 in Gdańsk. It was made of representatives of seventeen factories; each stood for the most important factory of every voivodeship of the pre-1975 Poland. The workers from the Białystok Voivodeship were represented by the Cotton Works Fasty in Białystok.

Apart from the National Strike Committee, several Interfactory Founding Committees (MKZ) were created in major cities, including Białystok where local leadership elected October 12, 1980 included three co-chairmen: Jerzy Prajzner, Stanisław Przestrzelski, and Jan Wołowski. For security reasons, these offices were moved to large factories for the time of the strike, no matter how long it was planned to take place. The MZK Białystok Committee was placed in the Factory of Instruments and Handles in Białystok. On August 28, 1980, the crew of the Instruments and Handles Factory in Białystok protested. The workers put forward 42 demands, demanding, inter alia, the formation of Free Trade Unions. The next day, the work of the Białystok Glassworks was interrupted, and on September 4, 2,000 people went on strike. employees of the Białystok Cotton Industry Plant "Fasty", drivers of the Municipal Transport Company (MPK) and taxi drivers. In the following days, the protests spread to the entirety of Białystok and the surrounding towns. A total of eighty strikes broke out in the voivodeship in August and September.

On September 10, the first in the region Founding Committee of the Independent Self-governing Trade Union, headed by Bernard Bujwicki, was established at Przedsiębiorstwo Zaopatrzenia Rolnictwa w Wodę "Wodrol" located at 7 Elewatorska street. Two days later, the first Interfactory Founding Committees (MKZ NSZZ) was established, headed by Michał Pietkiewicz, which apart from "Wodrol", also included the staff of the Agricultural Service and Electrification Company "Eltor". A week later, regional office registered in Gdańsk. Regardless of this initiative, representatives of Białystok Television Components "Biazet", Białystok Graphic Works, Białystok Politechnic and the Repair and Construction Cooperative (Polish: Spółdzielni Remontowo-Budowlanej) established contact with the Warsaw structures of "Solidarity" and began to develop a statute to register their own regional branch which had its seat at 13 Świętojańska Street room 201 and led by Stanisław Marczuk.

In the days following the initial hunger demonstration on 25 July 1981 in Kutno, additional demonstrations were organized in numerous cities across whole country including Białystok. Most of participants were women and their children, with men walking on the sides and trying to protect the demonstrators. On June 21, 1981, the banner of the Białystok Solidarity Regional Board was consecrated on a plot on Leszczynowa street which was used by Solidarity members gatherings where the St. Kazimierz Church was later built. On August 4, the delegation of the Presidium of the Union handed over to the Voivode of Białystok Kazimierz Dunaj a resolution in which the union demanded that decisive steps be taken to overcome the crisis. The next day, at the square in front of the regional Communist party headquarters taxi drivers and MPK drivers gathered. Then, an approximately four-kilometer string of vehicles decorated with flags and posters ran along downtown streets next to the buildings of the City Hall and the Provincial Committee of the Polish United Workers' Party. The next day, the taxi drivers' action was supported by retirees, pensioners and disabled people who gathered in the square in front of the building of the KW PZPR. After singing the national anthem, they formed a march and marched through the main streets of the city. In front of the Provincial Office building, they chanted the slogans: "We demand bread", "We demand the release of political prisoners", "Party, come to your senses". Authorities refrained from talking to the protesters. On August 6, there were work breaks in the Region. In this way, the workers expressed their disapproval of the situation in the country and the actions of the government. During the period of legal activity, "Solidarity" from Białystok had sharp disputes, but also cooperated with the local authorities in order to resolve various conflicts. The trade unions managed to get the president of Białystok to hand over a part of the building of WRZZ (Provincial Council of Trade Unions) known as "Dom Związkowca" located at Skladowskiej 3 Street for the needs of the Municipal House of Culture and Białystok Construction Union (Polish: Białostockiego Zjednoczenia Budownictwa) located at Skladowska 14 Street for offices of the Warsaw University branch in Białystok.

In connection with the imposition of martial law in Poland in December 1981, the operation "Fir" (Polish: Jodła) was announced at the Provincial Headquarters of the Milicja Obywatelska in Bialystok. On the night of 12/13 December, a total of 40 people were arrested, and the following 19 were arrested on the following days. Some of the internees were released until the end of December 1981. On 1 May 1982 Many thousands participants in independent 1 May demonstrations in, Białystok as well as in other places in the country. Citizens are also forbidden to move in public places from 22:00 to 6:00. The then voivode of Białystok Voivodeship, Kazimierz Dunaj, issued his own ordinances, banned the sale of alcoholic beverages, suspended the activities of theaters, philharmonics, museums, circuses, shooting ranges, community centers, and cultural and educational institutions. Managers of workplaces were obliged to their proper functioning. The voivode militarized workplaces, such as the Municipal Transport Company in Białystok, the Water and Sewerage Company, and the Provincial Headquarters of Fire Brigades. All phone connections blocked. There were no mass strikes at workplaces in Białystok. There was only an interruption of work in some workplaces, in Białystok Zakłady Podzespołów Telewizji Unitra Biazet. Attempts were also made to strike at the heating plant in Biawara.

==== Collapse of the communist regime ====
Although the election of 1989 was definitely won by "Solidarity" movement, the Communist party was still active. 8 January 1989. Employees of the Party Provincial Committee (then at Próchniaka Street), as usual began arriving to the compound early in the morning. Then, a group of students entered the building and blocked the entrance. On the balcony above the entrance appeared banners with the inscriptions "Occupation" and "PZPR Buildings for the University". Parallel, previously prepared sheets of gray paper appeared in the city with information - "The branch of the University of Warsaw in Bialystok is in a tragic housing situation. The PZPR has wonderful, unused facilities, built by the efforts of the entire nation. They should serve science." On Tuesday, Marian Gała, the Białystok voivode, invited students for talks. On the same day an agreement was signed with the city and party authorities that the PZPR buildings were handed over to the Białystok branch of the Warsaw University.

=== Third Polish Republic (1989–present) ===
The collapse of the Soviet Union and the Revolutions of 1989 which saw also the collapse of the People's Republic of Poland made its impact on Bialystok.

From August 21, 1989, Jerzy Czaban took over the office of president of the city worked well with the MRN. At that time, the most serious problem for Białystok residents was the difficult economic situation. Production fell, unemployment rose. It is true that salaries increased, but this only intensified inflation and high prices. The supply of basically all products has also deteriorated drastically, and the list of centrally imported goods has been limited. Food prices went up quickly. Along with the liberalization of the food and retail market, the supply of a number of goods has also decreased. The supply of meat and meat products, cheese, fish and vegetable fats, bread and pasta was lower. The housing market collapsed. Crews were dissatisfied with low wages and downtime. The progressing economic crisis, galloping inflation, uncontrolled increase in prices and wages, often following crew strikes, significantly worsened the social mood. People began to fear losing their jobs and worsening living standards. This intensified the mood of disbelief that the economic crisis could be overcome with the hitherto methods. For this reason, emergency strikes were announced in individual workplaces. Strike committees were formed, which included members of "Solidarity". The protesters demanded better working conditions and wage increases. President Czaban could do little in this field, as the budget was still managed by the voivode. During his term of office, the spatial development plan for the city center of Białystok was adopted, discussions were held on changing the function of the market at Bema Street, where the Jewish cemetery was located. Resolutions were adopted on spatial development of the following housing estates: Wysoki Stoczek, Przemysłowa, Jaroszówka, Pietrasze, Fasty and Bacieczki. S

Following the liberalization of trade, The city became major transit and trade point for merchandise arriving from Belarus and Russia, and to support that, the City Market was established. The Polish United Workers' Party lost its monopoly over political life in the city and a process of decommunization began with changing names of streets and squares.

Pope John Paul II visited the city on 5 June 1991 and was greeted at the Krywlany Airfield. During the Holy Mass, the Pope declared Sister Bolesława Lament blessed. Then he opened the Synod of the Archdiocese of Białystok in the Cathedral of the Assumption of the Blessed Virgin Mary and he also met with people from the orthodox community in the Cathedral of St. Nicholas. During his visit he decreed the establishment of the Białystok diocese which in the following year was raised to the rank of Roman Catholic Archdiocese of Białystok.

In 1995 the Białystok City Council appointed Krszysztof Jurgiel as city mayor. During his term, the city authorities implemented a policy of supporting families, especially those who fell into poverty under market economic conditions. Nearly 10 percent of the municipal budget was allocated annually for social welfare and family assistance. Caritas of the Archdiocese of Białystok received a building on Sienkiewicza Street from the city authorities to set up a shelter. A municipal facility was opened on Zaściańska Street. A shelter and hostel were opened on Włókiennicza Street, and a new Day Care Center for children from families with behavioral problems was opened on Barszczańska Street in Starosielce. A community self-help center for people with mental disorders was established on Warszawska Street. With the city's financial assistance, monuments to the Home Army and the Sybiraks were built, and the reconstruction of the Monument to the Defenders of Białystok in 1939 began.

In Klepacka Street, a new estate was built from the Białystok municipal budget. In 1994 to 1998 over 600 properties were built. In 1998, 116 apartments were built in the Barszczańska street estate. 123 rental apartments were completed, and construction began on new ones in the Social Housing Association buildings. Significant budgetary outlays on land preparation, development, and creating favorable conditions for investors resulted in the construction of a significant number of apartments. During this time, Białystok ranked second among cities with the highest number of apartments built, and first in municipal housing construction. Implementing the road construction program in single-family housing estates, developed during Krzysztof Jurgiel's term, allowed for the construction of several dozen kilometers of streets and sidewalks, providing them with technical infrastructure, and particularly the completion of missing gas installations. This eliminated muddy, sandy streets. Public transport lines were extended to these estates.

On 1 January 1999 Białystok was named the capital of the newly organized Podlaskie Voivodeship, which was created out of the former Białystok and Łomża Voivodeships and the eastern half of the former Suwałki Voivodeship, pursuant to the Polish local government reforms adopted in 1998.

Since the beginning of the century Białystok has significantly extended its area, incorporating neighboring villages such as Bialostoczek, Dziesieciny or Starosielce. The most recent incorporation, in 2006 were those of Zawady on the north and Dojlidy Gorne on the south. They have significantly increased the administrative area of the city to 102 km^{2}.

The accession of Poland to the EU in 2004 led to massive investments in the city, especially after the approval of Operational Program Development of Eastern Poland 2007–2013 as result of which the city saw modernization and completion of different projects: In 2008 'Alfa Centrum' was opened at the former site of Beckera Factory. A new municipal stadium was built Jagiellonia Białystok next to the City Market.

In 2004, during the 50th anniversary of the Białystok Philharmonic, and previously the Symphony Orchestra, Marcin Nałęcz Niesiołowski presented the idea of building a new opera hall during a concert. An honorary committee was formed, including then-Marshal Janusz Krzyżewski, Mayor of Białystok Ryszard Tur, Voivode Marek Strzaliński, and a group of approximately one hundred people connected with the city and Podlasie. The then-Minister of Culture, Waldemar Dąbrowski, and Deputy Marshal Krzysztof Putra provided significant assistance in implementing the project.

Białystok Subzone of the Suwałki Special Economic Zone was established in 2009 in Dojlidy district and covers an area of 30 ha. In October 2014, an application was forwarded to the management board of the SSEZ regarding the extension of the Białystok Subzone by more than 43 ha of land in Krywlany and almost 21 ha of plots of the Białystok Science and Technology Par which i located within the Dojlidy district, in the area of Borsucza, Żurawia and Myśliwska streets. It is located in the immediate vicinitys developed and built-up real estate with a service function and the area of the Białystok SSZ Subzone.

In 2015 the Municipal Waste Treatment Plant (Polish: Zakład Unieszkodliwiania Odpadów Komunalnych) in 40F Generała Władysława Andersa Street began operating, replacing the landfill in Hryniewicze. In 2014 the municipal heating company (Polish: Miejskim Przedsiębiorstwie Energetyki Cieplnej w Białymstoku (MPEC)) was purchased by Enea Group. The company has also been a co-owner since 2008, and since 2011 the actual owner of the Białystok Heat and Power Plant, which already works in cogeneration. In 2019 an agreement between Enea Ciepło and the Polish Government to modernize 18 km of pipelines as well as reconstruction of heating nodes. Individual nodes are constructed in order to reduce heat losses. The connection of Białystok Power Station with the municipal MPEC network will allow the optimization of heat production in the city. The CHP plant has two modern biomass-fired units with zero CO_{2} emissions. A major highway bypassing at the city edges, Generalska Route was built between 2009 and 2013 and Niepodległości Route (Polish: Trasa Niepodległości) was opened in 2019. The Porosły Interchange, a combination of the S8 Expressay with Generalska Route in Bialystok was opened for public use on 30 December 2020. As part of the investment, two two-level intersections are built (on the eight in Porosły and on Aleja Jana Pawła II at the intersection with Elewatorska Street), switches, viaduct over the tracks to Ełk. Service roads and other elements of road infrastructure, bicycle paths, bus bays, sidewalks and lighting were also built. The 800-meter section of Generala Kleeberga Street was also rebuilt. An additional junction will be built on the north side of S8 Expressway on the poviat road DP1551B, as well as a connection of the Voivodeship road 676 with the service road on the south side of the S8 Expressway (this is the place where the voivodship road intersects with the poviat road).

During the COVID-19 epidemic two temporary hospitals were set up in the city under the management of the University Clinical Hospital, nr. 1 located at the hospital infectious diseases complex at 14 Żurawia street and nr. 2 located at 1 Wołodyjowskiego street at the sports hall of the Medical University of Białystok. Hospital nr. 1 admits patients in harsh conditions while hospital nr. 2, which has no respirators admits patient in less severe condition, without chronic diseases. In addition, COVID department was opened in the Voivodeship Hospital in December 2020, located at the Nursing and Treatment building at 2/1 Wołodyjowskiego street. Additionally, at times of high number of infections the Department of Gastroenterology, Hepatology and Internal Diseases at 25 Skłodowskiej-Curie street was converted for COVID treatment as well.
