= Dziesięciny =

Dziesięciny may refer to:

- Dziesięciny I, one of the districts of the City of Białystok
- Dziesięciny II, one of the districts of the City of Białystok
