= Białystok City Market =

City market in Białystok
- Targowisko miejskie w Białymstoku
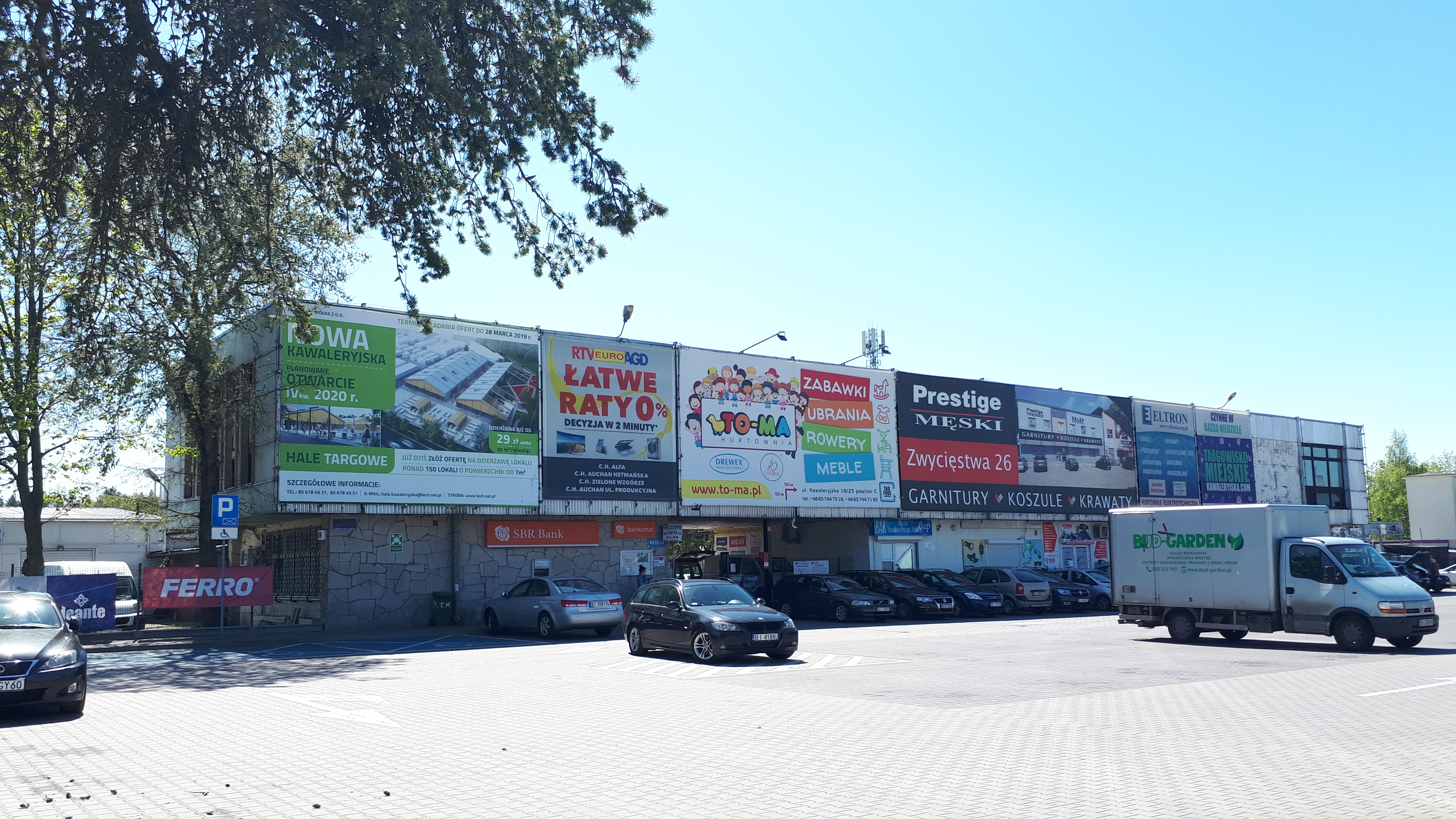
- Main entrance to the market

- Location within Poland Location within Podlaskie Voivodeship
- Alternative names: Targowisko

General information
- Location: Białystok, Podlaskie Voivodeship, Poland
- Coordinates: 53°6′13″N 23°8′39″E
- Opened: 1992
- Operator: Białystok City Hall

Białystok City Market (Polish: Targowisko miejskie w Białymstoku) is a retail market located in Kawaleryjska Street 19/23 in Białystok, Podlaskie Voivodeship in north-eastern Poland. For years it has been the largest commercial facility in the Podlaskie Voivodeship, with an area of almost 90,000 sq m. and over 2,000 permanent sales outlets.

== History ==
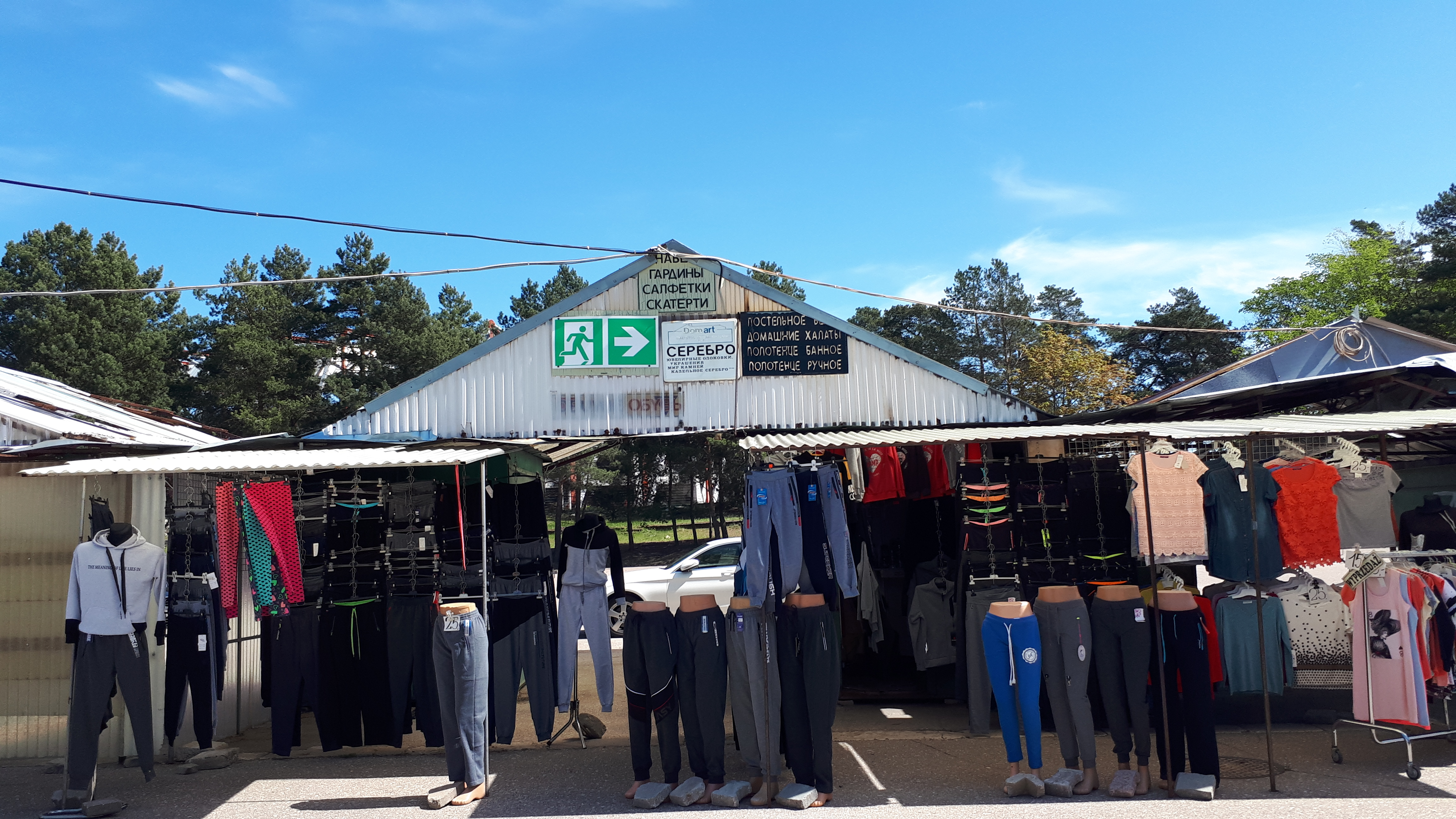
Stalls in the market, May 2020

In the early 90s with the collapse of the Communist bloc and the People's Republic of Poland and the liberalization of trade and transformation to market economy, the city hall was searching a place to hold a retail market instead of the existing one in Bema Street (itself opened following the closure of the Rynek Sienny in 1968) which had become too small. The location that was decided was the former harvest square in Kawaleryjska street. Due to concerns from the retailers' side regarding the relative distance of the location from the city center, the authorities made a commitment that they would not establish another market in the city center. A major mark point was 1994, the year the trade in Belarus was liberalized, a step that contributed to the growth of trade and activity in the market. The years 1995 to 1998 saw high growth and thousands of cars from Lithuania and Belarus arrived to sell their stock. In 1998 there was a slump, even a collapse of the market since the Polish government limited cross-border trade by introducing visas, a decision that led to demonstrations. In 2020 the market is planned to pass through modernization program.
