= Białostoczek =

Former village in Poland

Białostoczek was a village in Poland that was incorporated, on 10 May 1919, into the city of Białystok as Osiedle Białostoczek.
