= Stanisław Bukowski =

Polish cross-country skier

Personal information
- Nationality: Polish
- Born: 3 January 1923; Zakopane, Poland
- Died: 19 January 2002 (aged 79); Kościelisko, Poland

Sport
- Sport: Cross-country skiing

Stanisław Bukowski (3 January 1923 – 19 January 2002) was a Polish cross-country skier. He competed at the 1948 Winter Olympics and the 1956 Winter Olympics.
