= Osiedle Dziesięciny II, Białystok =

Dziesięciny II
- District (osiedle) of Białystok
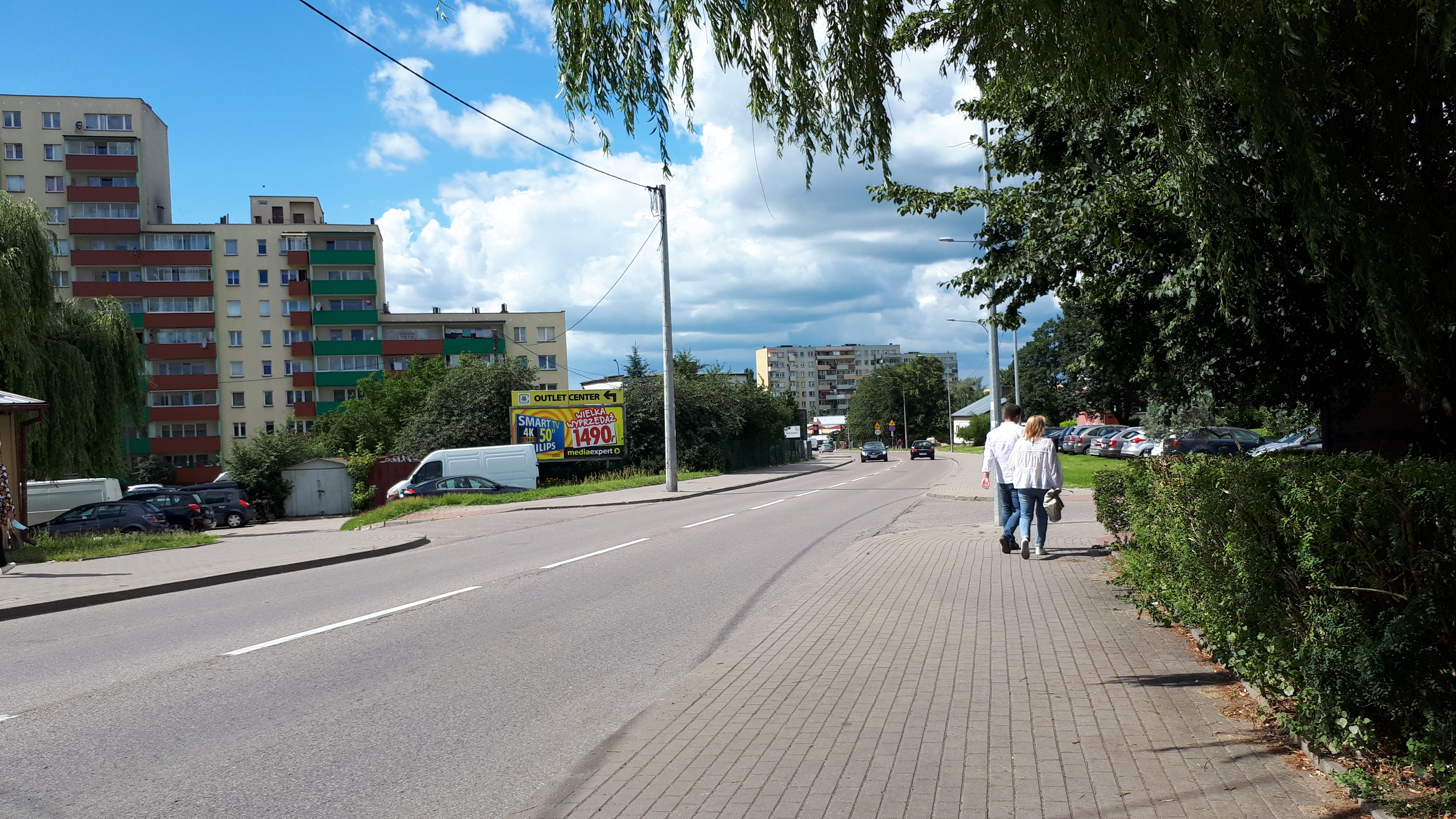
- Gajowa Street in the district, July 2020

- Location of Dziesięciny II District within Białystok
- Coordinates: 53°09′19″N 23°07′06″E
- Country: Poland
- Voivodeship: Podlaskie
- City: Białystok

Area
  - Total: 1.619 km^{2} (0.625 sq mi)

Dziesięciny II is one of the districts of the Polish city of Białystok.
