= Religion in Białystok =

This is a sub-article to Białystok

In the early 1900s, Białystok was reputed to have the largest concentration of Jews of all the cities in the world. In 1931, 40,000 Jews lived in the city, nearly half the city's inhabitants. The city is the seat of the Roman Catholic Archdiocese of Białystok. Establishment of the Diocese and the Archdiocese and the cities of Bialystok ended the period of the temporary church administration in the Bialystok region owned lands over the centuries to the Archdiocese of Vilnius, which after World War II remained in the Polish borders. The city is also the seat of the Bialystok-Gdansk Diocese of the Autocephalous Polish Orthodox Church. Bialystok is the largest concentration of Orthodox believers in Poland.

== Christianity ==
=== Catholicism ===
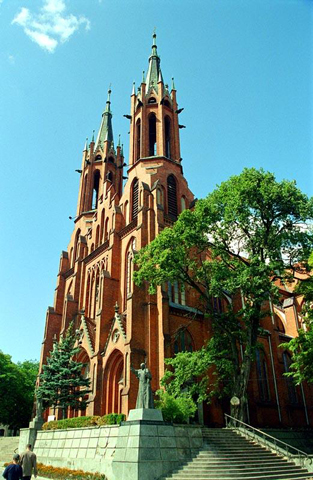
Cathedral

The city is the seat of the Roman Catholic Archdiocese of Białystok. Establishment of the Diocese and the Archdiocese and the cities of Bialystok ended the period of the temporary church administration in the Bialystok region owned lands over the centuries to the Archdiocese of Vilnius, which after World War II remained in the Polish borders. Pope John Paul II on 5 June 1991, during a visit to Bialystok, announced the decision to set up the Roman Catholic Archdiocese of Białystok. On 25 March 1992, Pope John Paul II in the Bull Totus Tuus Poloniae Populus reorganized Polish cities and dioceses. This document raised to the rank of diocese of the Archdiocese of Bialystok and Bialystok metropolis established, consisting of the Archdiocese of Bialystok, the Diocese of Drohiczyn and the Diocese of Łomża. The creation of the Diocese of Bialystok (1991) and raise it to an archbishopric and capital of Bialystok to the dignity of the metropolis (1992), was the culmination of the process become independent of the local Church. The first Archbishop of Bialystok on 25 March 1992 was appointed the former Bishop of Bialystok Dr. Edward Kisiel, whom the pope in a solemn Mass. Basilica of Saint. Peter in the Vatican City on June 29, 1992, the archbishop gave the pallium. Archbishop Kisel took a ceremonial ingress to the Basilica of the Metropolitan of Bialystok on 4 Oct 1992.

The city has 36 parishes, which are six deaneries. In Bialystok is also the Archdiocesan Major Seminary, and a branch of the Pontifical Faculty of Theology. At the University of Bialystok, there Interdepartmental Chair of Catholic Theology.

==== List of Catholic parishes ====
List of Parishes and Churches in the city:

- Parish MB Fatimskiej
- Parish Miłosierdzia Bożego
  - Sanktuarium Miłosierdzia Bożego
- Parish Najświętszego Serca Pana Jezusa
- Parish NMP Nieustającej Pomocy
- Parish St. Maksymiliana Kolbego
- Parish Świętej Rodziny
- Parish Zwiastowania Najświętszej Marii Panny
- Parish NMP Królowej Rodzin
- Parish St. Faustyny Kowalskiej
- Parish St. Floriana
- Parish St. Kazimierza Królewicza
  - St. Kazimierz Church
- Parish St. Krzysztofa
- Parish Wszystkich Świętych
- Parish Zmartwychwstania Pańskiego
- Parish Chrystusa Króla
- Parish Niepokalanego Serca Maryi
- Parish St. Jana Chrzciciela
- Parish St. Jerzego (Parish wojskowa)
- Parish St. Stanisława BM
  - St. Stanisława BM
- Parish bł. Bolesławy Lament
  - sanktuarium bł. Bolesławy Lament
- Parish pw. MB Różańcowej
- Parish NMP z Gwadelupe
- Parish Przemienienia Pańskiego
- Parish St. Andrzeja Boboli
- Parish St. Jadwigi Królowej
  - St. Jadwiga Church
- Parish St. Rafała Kalinowskiego
- Parish St. Rocha
  - St. Roch's Church in Białystok
- Parish Ducha Świętego
- Parish NMP Matki Kościoła
- Parish St. Anny
- Parish St. Józefa Oblubieńca
- Parish St. Karola Boromeusza
- Parish St. Pio z Pietrelciny
- Parish St. Wojciecha
- Parish Wniebowzięcia NMP

=== Orthodoxy ===
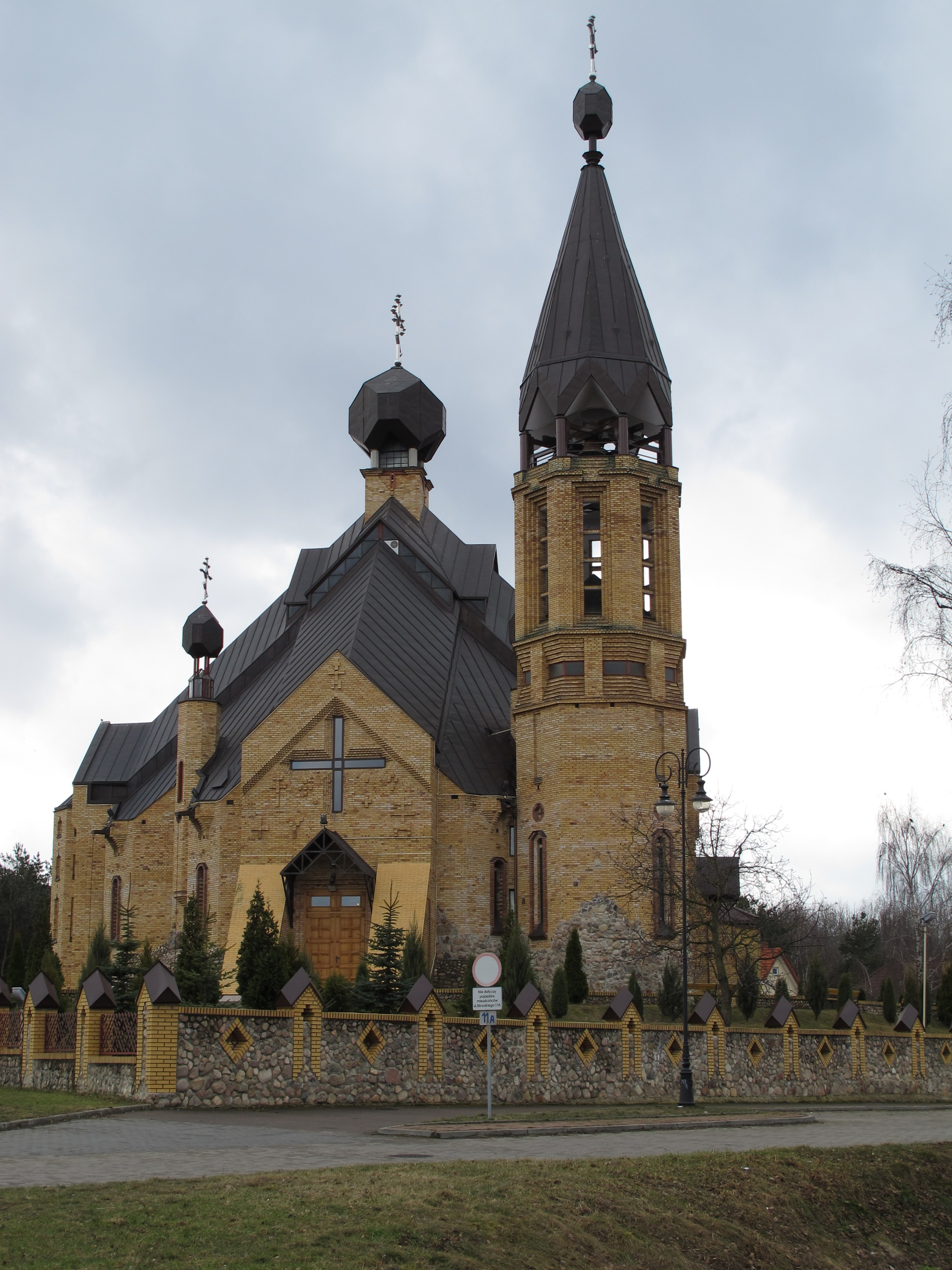
Cathedral

The city is the capital city of Bialystok-Gdansk diocese of the Autocephalous Polish Orthodox Church. Bialystok is the largest concentration of Orthodox believers in Poland. There are 11 Orthodox parishes. Such work Centre of Orthodox Culture, Radio Orthodoxia, Brotherhood of St. Cyril and Methodius, the Fellowship of Orthodox Youth Choir Aksion and Orthodox Charity Centre "Eleos. The diocese has its own clinic. Are issued to the magazine: "Arche. Messages Brotherhood", "Fos" and "Overview of the Orthodox." Hosts numerous Orthodox festivals, including International Festival of Orthodox Church Music Days Hajnowka and Bialystok Orthodox Church Music Days. The structures of the University of Bialystok Department of Orthodox Theology works. In the nearby there is a male Supraślu Monastery of the Annunciation, in the village podbiałostockiej Zwierki - Female Monastery of the Virgin Birth.

Białystok is home to the biggest Orthodox church in Poland, the Orthodox church of the Holy Spirit. Since 2007, in Bialystok works Church Primary School. St. Cyril and Methodius. For now, the school has one class.

==== History ====
The first Orthodox church in today's Białystok was built in the 16th century. It was founded within the Białystok estates by the owner of the Dojlidzki and Zabłudów manors, the Orthodox magnate Hrehory Chodkiewicz. On June 21, 1571, Hrehory Chodkiewicz, who was the Grand Hetman of Lithuania, gave Kuźma Dymitrowicz, a clergyman from Dojlidy, a plot of land and a tithe from the village of Krywlany. The Chodkiewicz family founded numerous Orthodox churches around the Białystok estate: in Topilec, Fasty, Baciuty, Zabłudów, and the well-known monastery in Supraśl. The Dojlidy parish was established not only to serve the inhabitants of the Dojlidy manor, but also the surrounding estates. The Dojlidy church was originally dedicated to St. Nativity of the Mother of God and St. the prophet Elijah. At that time (1617) the heir of Białystok, Piotr Wiesiołowski, founded the Catholic Church of St. Ascension of the Blessed Virgin Mary. Throughout the 17th century, the Orthodox inhabitants of the Białystok estate were served by the Dojlidy clergy, and the Catholic ones by the parish priests of the Church of St. Assumption of the Blessed Virgin Mary. Fundamental changes in sacral construction took place when the Branicki Gryf family became the owner of Białystok in 1665. The emergence of new sacral buildings of the Eastern rite should be associated with the person of Hetman Jan Klemens Branicki. In 1749, the hetman obtained city rights from King August III for his ancestral residence. From that year, Białystok became the largest urban center in Podlasie and an important center of cultural life. The change in the city's function resulted in an influx of settlements, and thus also new church investments. Jan Klemens Branicki founded two chapels, one dedicated to St. Roch (1750) and the second St. Mary Magdalene (1758). The latter, which was later transformed into an Orthodox church, was made of brick and covered with tiles with one white dome. Earlier, on February 9, 1727, the Branicki family funded the church of St. Nicholas for the Ruthenian population living in this area, as a branch of the Dojlidy church. Piotr Łobaszewski, the parish priest of Dojlidy, mentioned in the sources as early as 1711, received an extensive Orthodox church jurydyka between today's Lipowa and Sosnowskiego streets and a land plot in three fields. In addition, the priest was endowed with land between the Biała River and today's streets: Lipowa, Malmeda and Nowy Świat. The next vicars of the Dojlidy parish priest who served the Bialystok Orthodox church were pastor Malabrocki and pastor Jakub Drużbacki. In 1752, father Jakub Baranowski became the pastor of the Dojlidy and Bialystok churches. In the years 1769-1792, Wasyl Krassowski was the Parson of the Białystok churches, and from 1793 to 1812 Jan Krassowski became the pastor. The inventory drawn up after the death of the crown hetman in 1772 mentions for the first time the Białystok Orthodox church at Choroska Street (modern Lipowa Street).

The rapid development of Białystok in the first half of the 19th century resulted in an increase in the number of its inhabitants, including the Orthodox population. The population of this denomination increased with the return of the Uniates to the Orthodox Church and the arrival of a significant number of tsarist officials to the city. In this situation, a decision was made to build a new church, next to the existing wooden church on the cemetery square. The new church of Orthodox Cathedral of St. Nicholas was built in the years 1843-1846. During the construction, the wooden church was demolished. At the same time, the Orthodox cemetery was liquidated, and the burials were moved to the cemetery created around the Orthodox Church of St. Mary Magdalene. The new church was built in the late Byzantine cross-dome style and referred to the architecture of the Holy Trinity Cathedral of the Alexander Nevsky Lavra in Saint Petersburg. The church was consecrated in 1846 by the Lithuanian metropolitan and bishop of Vilnius, Józef Siemaszka. In the years 1839-1900, administratively, the Orthodox parish in Białystok belonged to the Białystok deanery, the Orthodox Lithuanian diocese with the episcopal seat in Vilnius. It was one of the westernmost dioceses of the Orthodox Church in the Russian Empire.

The factor accelerating the development of church construction in Białystok was the arrival of four regiments of Russian soldiers to the city. In 1879, the construction of the barracks of the Vladimir Regiment began in Piaski District, in 1884 - of the Kazan barracks in Wygoda District, in 1887, the barracks of 4th Hussar Mariupol Regiment in Bema District and in 1890 barracks of the 4th Kharkov Uhlan Regiment in Nowe Miasto District. Two garrison churches were built to provide spiritual services to the soldiers staying in Białystok: Kazan Icon of the Mother of God (at present Traugutta street) and pw. Serafin Sarowski (in the barracks at Kawaleryjska Street). In 1900, the church of St. Cyril and Methodius was built in Starosielce, then independent settlement. In 1898, on the initiative of the Lithuanian archbishop Josif, the construction of a new cathedral of St. Resurrection of Christ at Sienkiewicza and Fabryczna Streets. The investment of the three-nave cathedral was completed just before the outbreak of World War I. The evacuation of the Orthodox population deep into Russia at the beginning of 1915 meant that the church of St. Resurrection of Christ did not take over the function of the main diocesan temple. In 1900, due to the administrative reform of the Lithuanian diocese, Grodno diocese with its capital in Grodno was separated from it. Like the Lithuanian diocese, it was also one of the westernmost dioceses of the Orthodox Church in the Russian Empire. In 1907, another administrative change took place, the Vicar Bishopery of Bialystok was established. Its superior, the Bishop of Białystok, was based in the Orthodox Monastery of the Annunciation of the Most Holy Mother of God in Supraśl.

In the years 1918-1939, the garrison churches were taken away from the Orthodox community of Białystok and turned into Catholic churches. In 1919, as part of the revindication action, the church in Starosielce and Dojlidy (districts of the city) was taken by the state authorities. The Catholic Church made efforts to take over the church of St. Mary Magdalene. In 1937, the church of St. Resurrection of Christ, and the building material was intended for the construction of the fence of the St. Roch's Church. As a result of these activities, only two Orthodox churches remained in Białystok, including the St. Nicholas the Wonderworker, which was built in the years 1843-1846.

At the end of the 70s and early 80s Representatives of "Solidarity" movement also tried to establish cooperation with the authorities of the Orthodox Church, because in Białystok Orthodox believers were the largest social group right after Catholics. The authorities of Solidarity organization made their first official contact with the Orthodox curia in Białystok on December 13, 1980. During the meeting, it was proposed that the Church solicit the state authorities to introduce broadcasting services on the radio and legal sanctioning days off on Orthodox holidays. Archbishop Nikanor reacted with restraint to the proposal, claiming that the right to resolve all major problems of the Orthodox Church in Poland belongs to the superior authorities and the Office for Religious Affairs. Solidarity members were not satisfied and on January 6, 1981 Chairman Jerzy Prajzner, Jerzy Zegarski and Leszek Sławiński visited the Diocese of Bialystok-Gdansk, expressing their support and the need to broadcast Orthodox services on the local radio station and expressed support for the construction of an Orthodox church in Wygoda district in Białystok.

The construction of the Orthodox Church of the Holy Spirit began in 1982 and was completed in 1996, due to the efforts of pastor Serafin Żeleźniakowicz. In 1980, there were only four parishes in Białystok, while in 2000 there were already eleven. To the existing parishes of St. Nicholas the Wonderworker, as well as in Fasty, Dojlidy and Starosielce, the parishes of the Holy Spirit, St. George the Victorious, St. Panteleimon, Resurrection, Hagia Sophia, All Saints and military Ordinate st. Peter and Paul joined. In the 1970s and 1980s, the construction of new Orthodox churches developed on a larger scale, among other due to increasing demand as a result of growing emigration of Orthodox believers from villages in Bialystok Region to the city.

On June 28, 1982, the Metropolitan of America and Canada, Theodosius paid a visit to Białystok.

The Social-Christian Union was the main organizer of the Białystok celebrations of the 1000th anniversary of the Christianization of Rus' in 1988.

==== List of Orthodox parishes ====
There are 11 parishes in the city:

- Parish of St. Nicholas (Białystok)
  - Cathedral of St. Nicholas
  - Orthodox Church of St. Mary Magdalene
  - Chapel of St. Eufrozyny Połockiej
- Parish of St. Sofii Mądrości Bożej (Białystok)
  - Church of Mądrości Bożej
- Parish of Świętego Ducha (Białystok)
  - Church of the Holy Spirit
- Parish of St. Jerzego (Białystok)
  - Church of St. Jerzego
- Parish of Zmartwychwstania Pańskiego (Białystok) (orthodox)
  - Church of Zmartwychwstania Pańskiego
- Parish of Wszystkich Świętych (Białystok) (orthodox)
  - Church of Wszystkich Świętych (Białystok)
- Parish of St. Proroka Eliasza (Białystok)
  - Church of St. Eliasza (Białystok)
- Parish of Zaśnięcia NMP (Białystok)
  - Church of Zaśnięcia NMP (Białystok)
- Parish of St. Męczennika Pantelejmona (Białystok)
  - Church of St. Męczennika Pantelejmona (Białystok)
- Parish of St. Apostoła Jana Teologa (Białystok)
  - Church of St. Apostoła Jana Teologa

=== Protestantism ===
In Bialystok are the following Protestant churches: a Lutheran parish, two Pentecostal churches, a Baptist church, a congregation of the Church of God in Christ and the Seventh Day Adventist church.

=== Other ===
Other denominations in Bialystok include Free Bible Students, Jehovah's Witnesses and Latter-day Saints.

== Islam ==
The Muslim Religious Union in the Polish Republic was reactivated in 1947. It is currently involved in the Muslim religious community in Bialystok. The head of the Polish Muslims is mufti Tomasz Miskiewicz, Chairman of the Supreme College (based in Bialystok, Poland) was elected to that post - the first time in postwar history of a relationship - March 20, 2004 at the XV Congress of the Muslim Religious Association. Earlier, the presidents exercising the duties included Stefan Bajraszewski, Stefan Mucharski, Jan Sobolewski, and Stefan Korycki.

== Judaism ==
In the early 1900s, Białystok was reputed to have the largest concentration of Jews of all the cities in the world. In 1931, 40,000 Jews lived in the city, nearly half the city's inhabitants. There were more than 60 synagogues and other Jewish institutions in the city.

During World War II most of the synagogues were destroyed because of a ruthless policy pursued by the Nazis of pillage and removal of the non-German population.

The synagogues destroyed included:

- Great Synagogue of Białystok
- Stara Synagoga Piaskower
- Synagoga Pułkowa
- Synagoga Chorszul
- Synagoga Stara
- Synagogue Nomer Tamid

Several hundred Jews survived the war and returned to Białystok, and only three structures of significance to the Jews survived:

- Synagoga Beit Szmuel
- Cytron Synagogue
- Synagoga Piaskower

The last operating synagogue in Białystok was the Cytron Synagogue, which closed its doors in the late 1960s. In 2008, the University of Białystok Foundation established the educational Jewish Heritage Trail.
