= Orthodox Church of St. John the Evangelist in Białystok =

- Cerkiew św. Apostoła Jana Teologa w Białymstoku
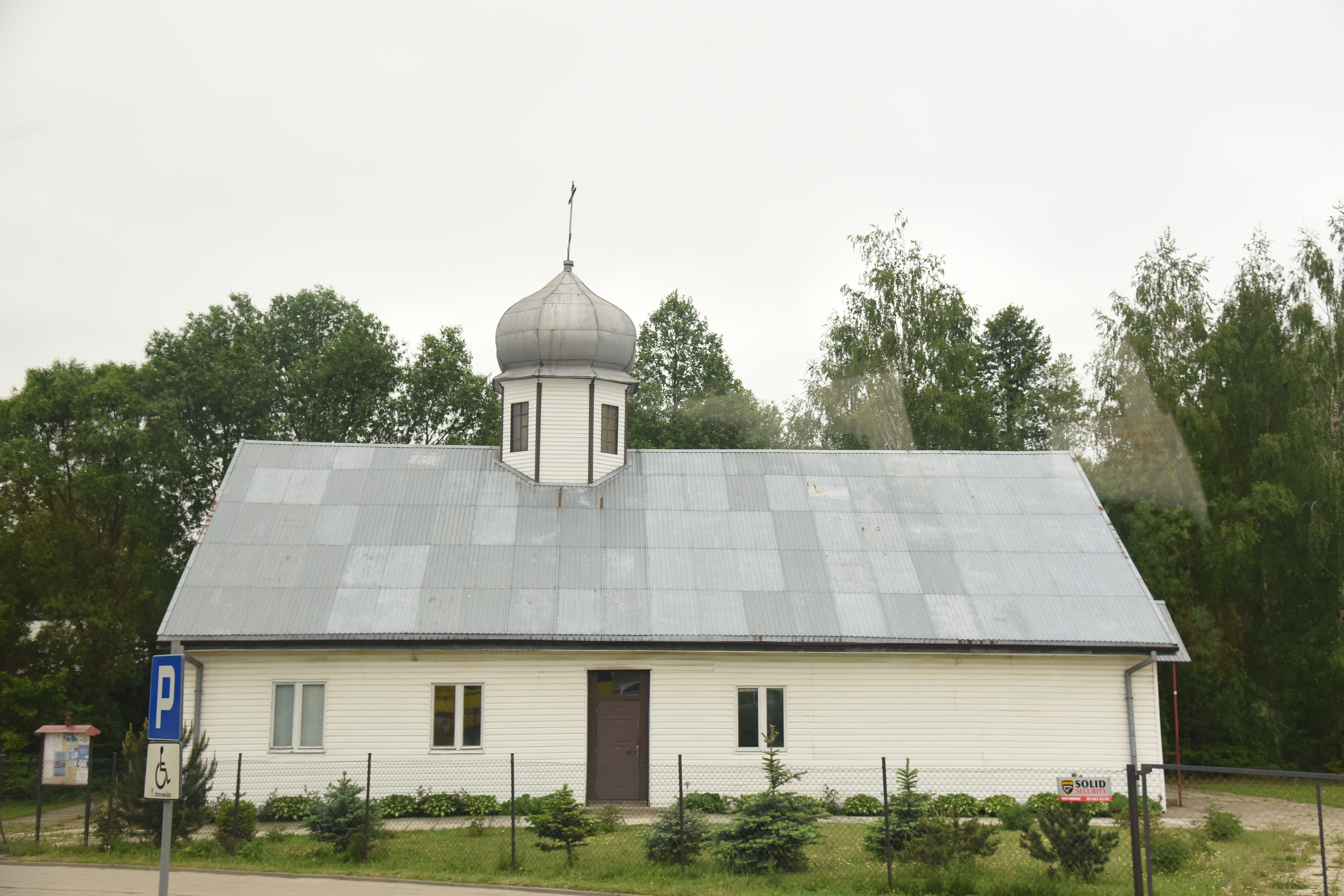
- Orthodox Church of St. John the Evangelist in Białystok
- 53°08′53″N 23°05′26″E
- Location: Bacieczki District, Białystok
- Denomination: Eastern Orthodox
- Website: soborbialystok.pl

Architecture
- Completed: 2007

Administration
- Diocese: Białystok and Gdańsk
- Deanery: Białystok

Orthodox Church of St. John the Evangelist in Białystok (Polish: Cerkiew św. Apostoła Jana Teologa w Białymstoku) is an orthodox church in Bacieczki District of Białystok.

== History ==
While the current church structure is temporary, it has a long history. Initially, the building belonged to the Hajnówka forest district. Father Serafim Żeleźniakowicz, when organizing the parish in Hajnówka, adapted it to the Church of St. Nicholas. The Holy Trinity Cathedral was built next to it.

After the church in Czyże burned down, the church from Hajnówka was dismantled and transported to Czyże. It served there for eleven years, until a new church was built. It served the faithful in the Nowe Miasto district in Białystok for another eleven years, until the Church of St. George was built.

In Bacieczki, there used to be an Orthodox church, founded in the 18h century by Grzegorz Chodkiewicz, the Grand Hetman of Lithuania. However, for unknown reasons, the church was dismantled in 1773, and the material obtained from it was transported to the town of Zawyki, in order to expand the local church (this church has survived to this day and currently functions as a Roman Catholic cemetery church under the invocation of the Name of Mary). The area where the church probably stood is called by the locals "tombs". It is a place on a hill at the junction of Jana Pawla II and Narodowych Sił Zbrojnych streets. Before World War I, wooden crosses stood there, today only the custom of blessing fields on the day of the patron saint of the village of Bacieczki, St. John the Theologian (i.e. May 21) has survived in the memory of the locals.

Archbishop Jakub Kostiuczuk erected a new parish, separated from the area of the parish of the Holy Spirit, on May 29, 2007, and on June 30, 2007, he consecrated a cross on the future construction site of the church.

Since 2016 a new church structure is being built next to the existing, temporary one.
