= Orthodox Church of St. Euphrosyne in Białystok =

Orthodox church of St. Euphrosyne in Białystok
- Cerkiew św. Eufrozyny Połockiej w Białymstoku
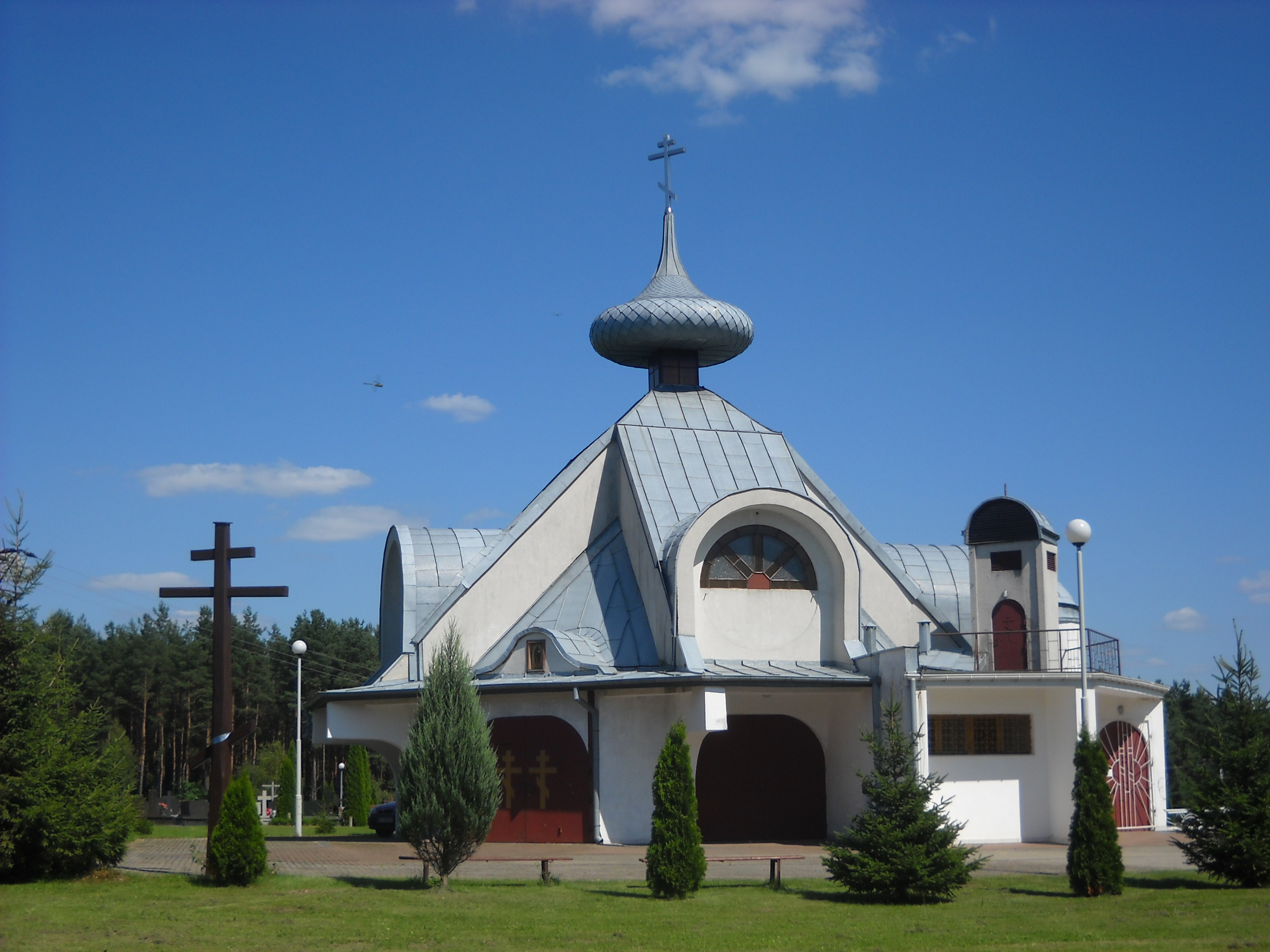
- Orthodox church of St. Euphrosyne in Białystok
- 53°08′09″N 23°04′50″E
- Location: Leśna Dolina District, Białystok
- Denomination: Eastern Orthodox
- Website: soborbialystok.pl

History
- Consecrated: 1 November 1993

Architecture
- Groundbreaking: 1990
- Completed: 1993

Administration
- Diocese: Białystok and Gdańsk
- Deanery: Białystok

Orthodox Church of St. Euphrosyne in Białystok (Polish: Cerkiew św. Eufrozyny Połockiej w Białymstoku) is an orthodox church in Leśna Dolina District, Białystok.

== History ==
The proboszcz of Saint Nicholas Cathedral, Serafim Żeleźniakowicz agitated for the need to build a church in the territory of the newly established Orthodox cemetery. On February 10, 1988, the deputy voivode of Białystok voivodeship established the location of the chapel in a letter and recommended the development of a technical project for the facility. Architects Aleksandr Bielski and Jan Kielecki were responsible for preparing the appropriate plans.

On September 1, 1990, during the ceremony of consecration of the cemetery, the cornerstone for the construction of the chapel was laid. Despite initial difficulties (related to obtaining permission to use the high-voltage line and bringing running water to the construction site), the work progressed very quickly. In June 1992, the dome of the temple was topped with a cross. The ceremony of raising the cross was led by Archbishop Sawa, bishop of the Diocese of Białystok-Gdańsk, assisted by a large number of clergy. On June 5, 1993, the first liturgy was celebrated in the chapel under construction. On November 1, 1993, by the then Archbishop of Białystok and Gdańsk Sawa (Hrycuniak) blessed the altar and consecrated the church.
