= Orthodox Church of St. Mary Magdalene in Białystok =

- Cerkiew św. Marii Magdaleny w Białymstoku
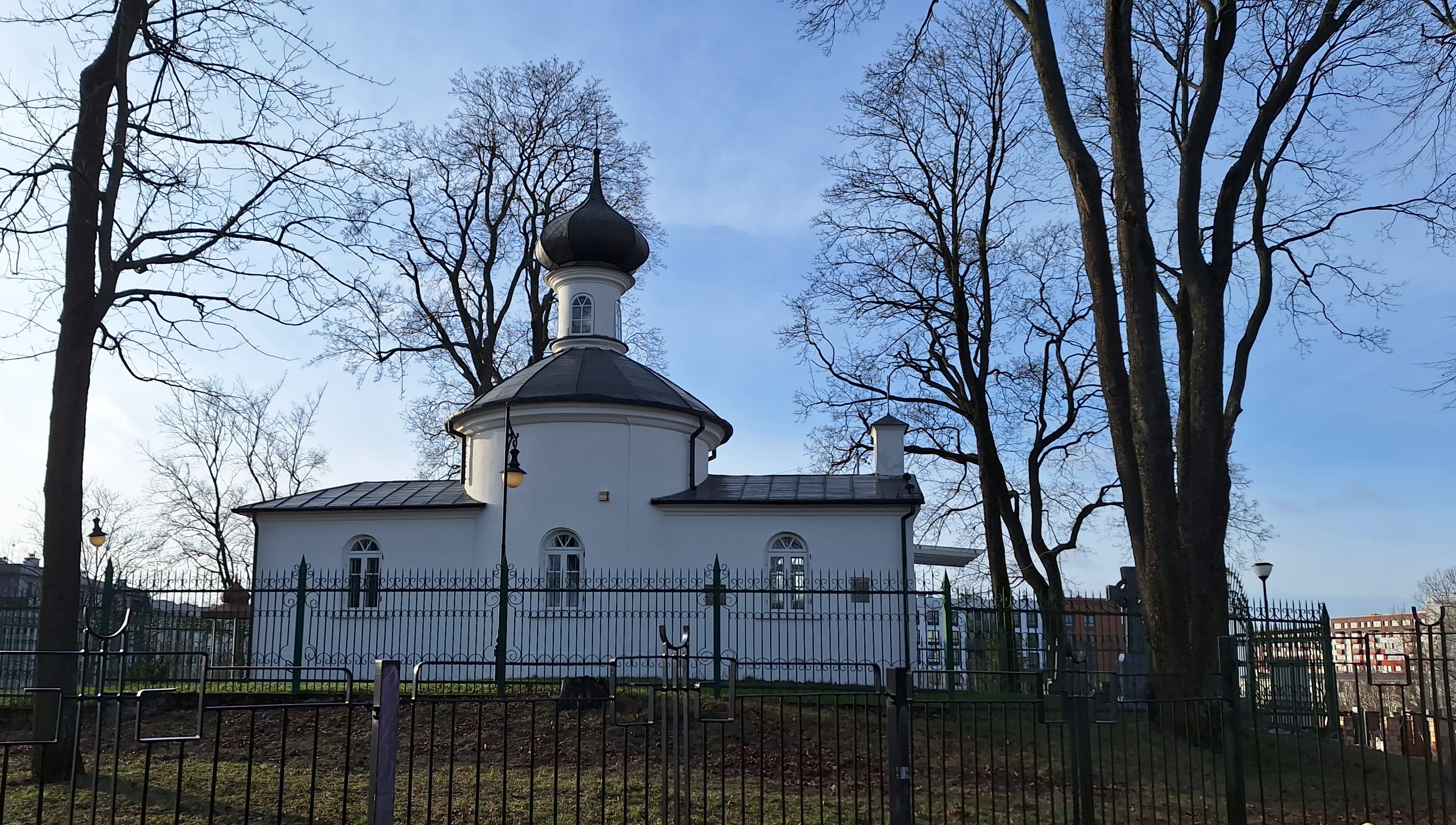
- Orthodox Church of St. Mary Magdalene in Białystok
- 53°07′47″N 23°08′54″E
- Location: Centrum District, Białystok
- Denomination: Eastern Orthodox

History
- Consecrated: 25 July 1861

Architecture
- Style: Baroque architecture
- Groundbreaking: 1752
- Completed: 1758

Administration
- Diocese: Białystok and Gdańsk
- Deanery: Białystok

Orthodox Church of St. Mary Magdalene in Białystok (Polish: Cerkiew św. Marii Magdaleny w Białymstoku) is an orthodox church in Białystok. It is located in the Central District of the city and is listed as a cultural heritage monument.

== History ==
The temple was founded by Jan Klemens Branicki in 1758 as a Catholic roadside chapel dedicated to St. Mary Magdalene. It was consecrated by priest Ignacy Jakub Massalski, later Bishop of Vilnius. The chapel belonged to the altar of St. Roch, which Hetman Branicki founded in 1750. The temple was built in the Baroque style in the form of a rotunda on a high hill, which in the 18th century was located outside the city limits.

Due to the overcrowding of the existing cemeteries, a new Catholic cemetery, then called a parish cemetery, was probably built in 1807 near the chapel. According to Father Tadeusz Krahel's assumptions, in 1814 the cemetery was divided into a Uniate and Orthodox section.

It is difficult to determine the date when the chapel was taken over by the Orthodox Church. Białystok historian Piotr Chomik believes that it was certainly not the year 1865, as Father Jan Kurczewski wrote. Already in 1860, on the initiative of the Orthodox (initially Greek Catholic until the Union of Brest was abolished by the Russian authorities in 1839) parish of St. Nicholas, renovation and expansion of the chapel were carried out. The chapel was consecrated for use by the Orthodox Church on July 25, 1861, by the then parish priest of the Orthodox Cathedral of St. Nicholas, Jan Sitkiewicz. The next reconstruction took place in 1865, and in 1891 the temple was fenced.

In the years 1957–1958, a trial was held before the District Court in Białystok between the Orthodox Church and the Roman Catholic Church over the ownership of the cemetery and chapel. The verdict awarded 2/3 of the cemetery and the church to Catholics. Both parties filed an appeal, but the case did not proceed as the provincial authorities have submitted a letter to the Municipal Board of Municipal Economy and Housing in Białystok concerning the closure of the Orthodox cemetery at the church and the creation of a city park on the site. Ultimately, in the disputed case, a decision was made that the chapel, together with the burial cemetery, would become the property of the State Treasury. In 1964, the Presidium of the Provincial National Council issued a final decision in which the Orthodox Church was informed that it could lease the chapel and the area around it from the city.

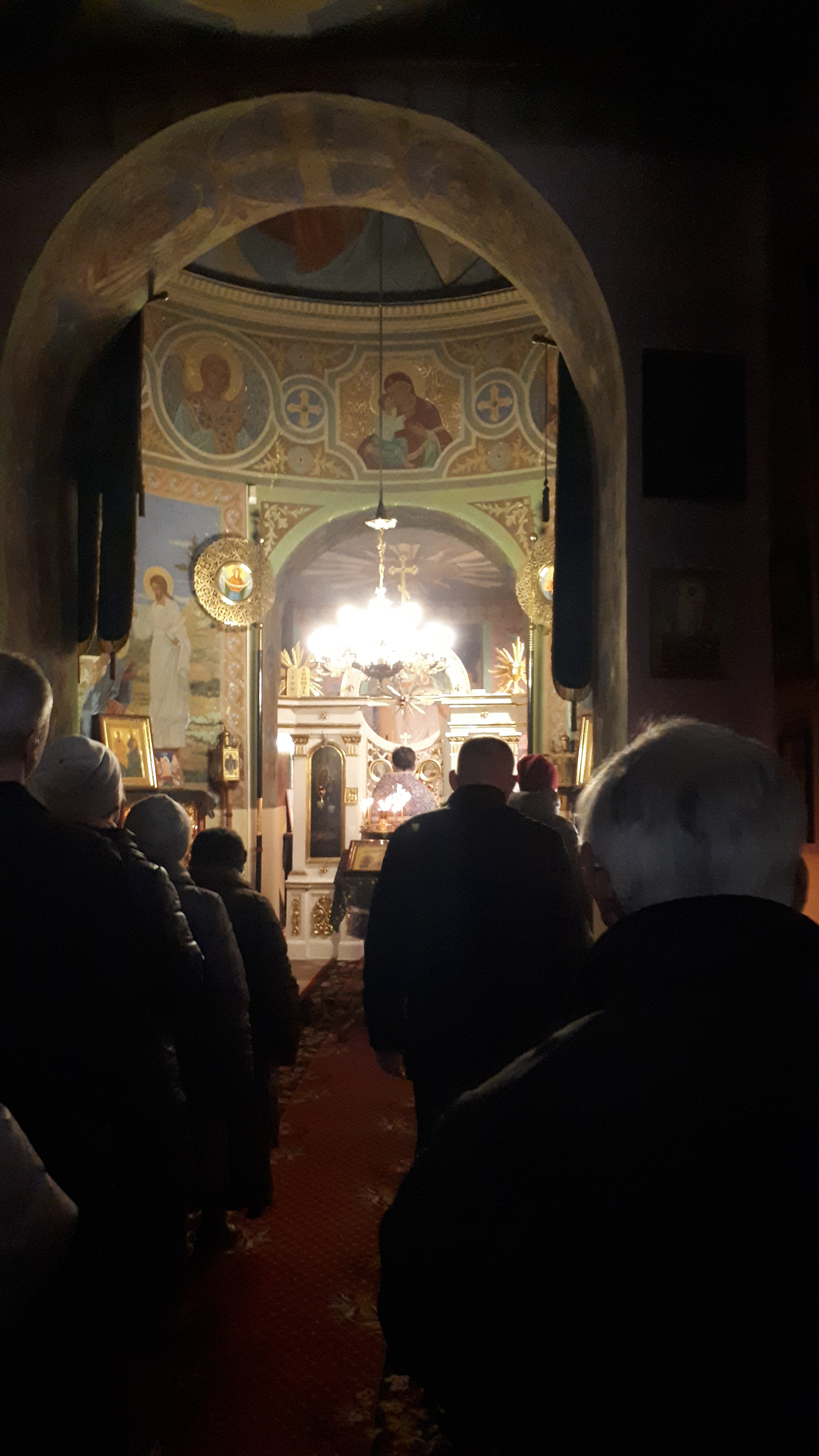
Interior of the church

The matter was legally settled only in 1991, when part of the hill (409 m^{2}) was transferred to the Polish Autocephalous Orthodox Church. On October 9, 1991, the Department of Citizens' Affairs of the Voivodeship Office in Białystok issued a decision stating that after considering the application of the parish priest of the Orthodox parish of St. Nicholas in Białystok, on the basis of the Act of July 4, 1991 on the relationship between the state and the Polish Orthodox Church, the real estate marked with the land registry number 1690/2, on which the church is located, by operation of law became the property of the Orthodox parish of St. Nicholas in Białystok on July 29, 1991, i.e. on the day the aforementioned act came into force. This decision became final and binding on November 5, 1991. The decision was re-approved in 2006.

In the years 1970–1973, the city authorities carried out a large-scale revitalization project near the church which was part of the preparations for the Central Harvest Festival (1973). It consisted of digging a large-sized amphitheatre into the eastern slope of the hill. The construction of the facility and the accompanying infrastructure led to the destruction of many graves. According to the authorities, the argument for this solution was the extreme devastation and oblivion of the cemetery. In 1970, the barrels of four cannons were extracted from the ruined tomb of an anonymous Russian artillery officer and transferred to the Army Museum in Białystok. They are currently exhibited in the Podlaski Border Guard Regional Unit at 100 Bema street.

The cemetery area on the hill of St. Mary Magdalene has been the subject of archaeological research since 2002, which intensified in 2006 due to the liquidation of the old amphitheatre and the construction of the Podlaska Opera and Orchestra.

In 1995, the military parish of Saints Peter and Paul was established, for which the church of St. Mary Magdalene became a parish church (it served this function until October 2020).

Since 2021, the church has been used by the Orthodox Academic Office at the Department of Orthodox Theology of the University of Białystok. The custodian of the church is Rev. Dr. Włodzimierz Misijuk.
