= Orthodox cemetery in Białystok (Leśna Dolina) =

Cemetery in Białystok, Poland

- Cmentarz prawosławny w Białymstoku (Leśna Dolina)
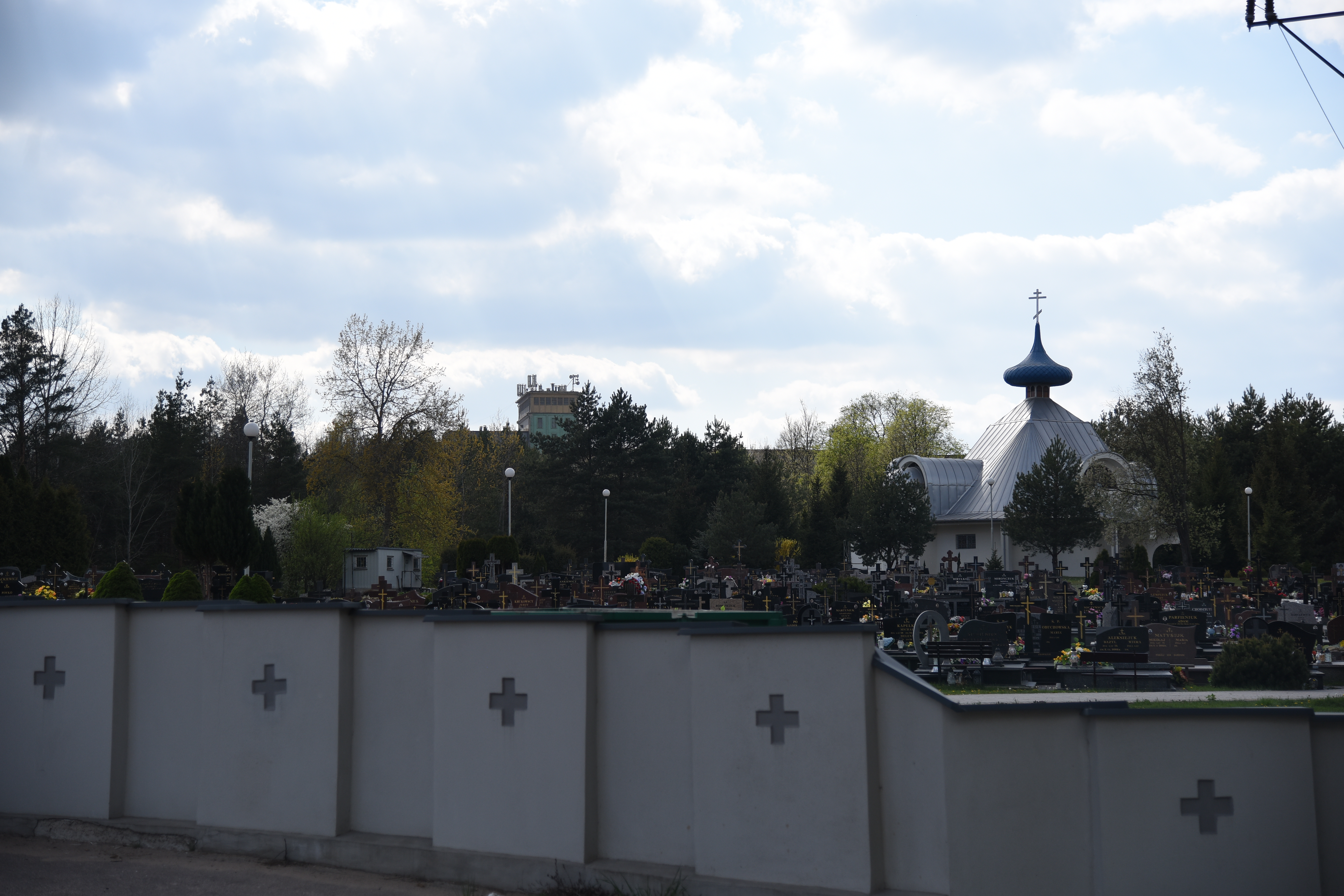
- Interactive map of Orthodox cemetery in Białystok (Leśna Dolina)

Details
- Established: 1987
- Location: 67 Boboli Street, Leśna Dolina District, Białystok
- Country: Poland
- Coordinates: 53.13576702°N 23.081753843°E
- Type: Orthodox cemetery
- Owned by: Polish Orthodox Church
- Size: 8.3 hectares (21 acres)

Orthodox cemetery in Białystok in Leśna Dolina (Polish: Cmentarz prawosławny w Białymstoku (Leśna Dolina)) is an orthodox cemetery located in Leśna Dolina District in Białystok. The cemetery has a territory of 8.3 hectare and is planned to accommodate 8,000 graves.

== History ==
In September 1984, the parish priest of the St. Nicholas cathedral, Serafim Żeleźniakowicz, began efforts to designate a new site for a new cemetery. He submitted an application to the city surveyor to allocate the plot at 7 Szosa Ełcka street for the burial of the deceased due to the exhaustion of the burial space at the existing orthodox cemeteries in the city. The application was rejected. The search for another site was not completed until 1986. The parish of St. Nicholas was then granted the right to land on the outskirts of Białystok, at 67 Olejniczka street (currently św. Boboli street).

On October 31, 1986, the voivode of Białystok Voivodeship, Marian Gała, issued a decision on determining the location of the new religious cemetery. The decision stated that the land on Słoneczny Stok (with geodetic numbers 242 and 243) is excluded from agricultural purposes. The parish was ordered to prepare an implementation plan for the development of the burial area and to agree on it with the Provincial Sanitary Inspectorate. In December 1986, the St. Nicholas Cathedral parish acquired the above-mentioned plots by a legally binding notarial deed. The official permit for the construction of the cemetery was issued by the Department of Urban Planning, Architecture and Building Supervision of the City Hall in Białystok on November 13, 1987.
