= Centrum, Białystok =

Centrum
- District (osiedle) of Białystok
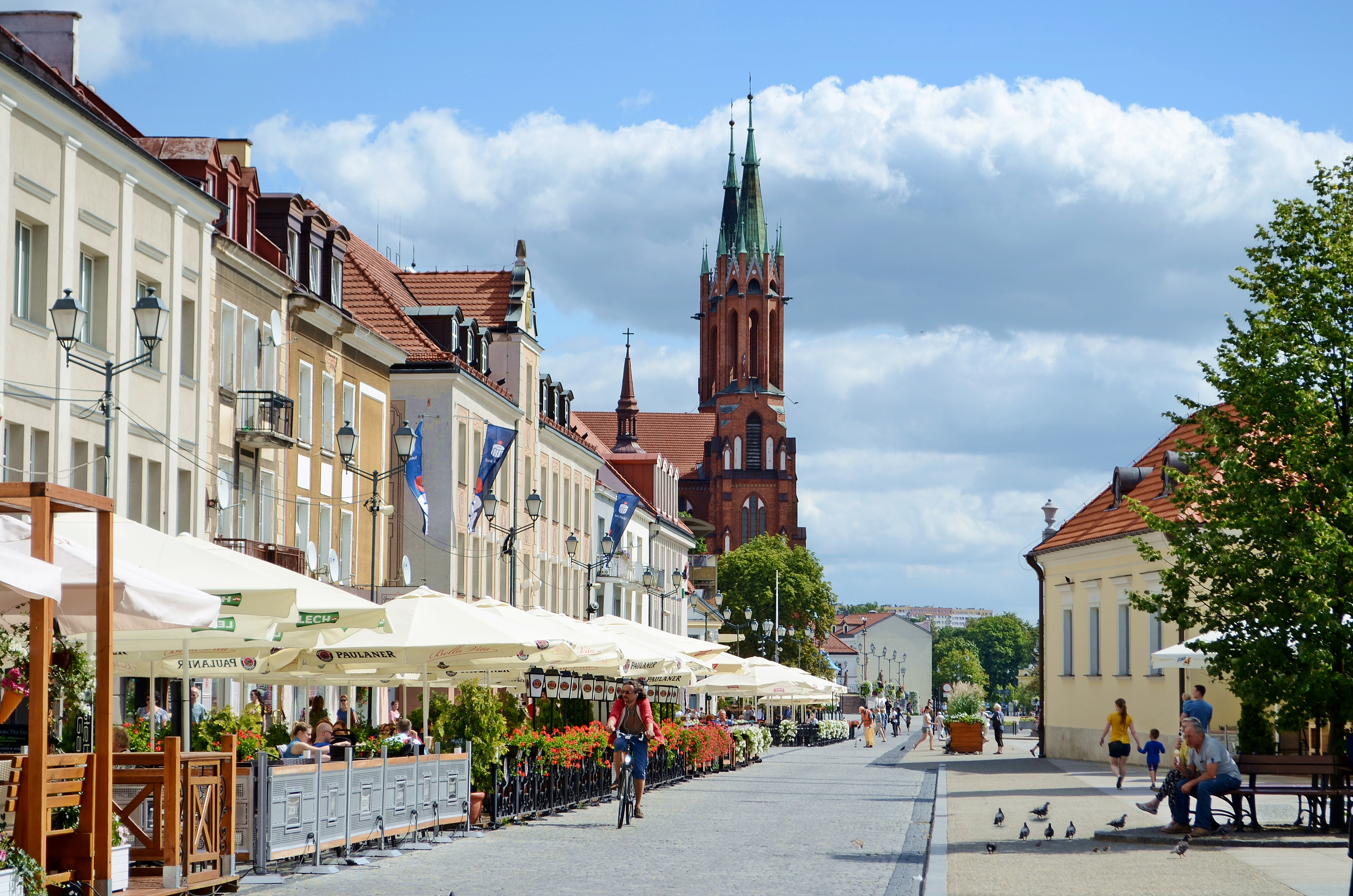

- Location of Centrum district within Białystok
- Coordinates: 53°7′58″N 23°9′19″E
- Country: Poland
- Voivodeship: Podlaskie
- County/City: Białystok
- Notable landmarks: List: Medical University of Białystok; St. Roch's Church; Podlaskie Library; Branicki Palace; Podlaskie Museum

Area
  - Total: 1.947 km^{2} (0.752 sq mi)
- Time zone: UTC+1 (CET)
  - Summer (DST): UTC+2 (CEST)
- Postal code: 15-xxx
- Area code: +48 85
- Website: http://www.bialystok.pl

Osiedle Centrum is the oldest, central, representative district of the Polish city of Białystok.

== History ==
Centrum district marks the historical core around which Białystok grew and developed. The historical core consists the Branicki Palace, the territories surrounding it as well as the nearby Kościuszko Market Square which acts as the central public space used for gatherings and public events.

The regaining of independence by Poland and the formation of the Second Polish Republic led to a construction boom in the city, notably the beginning of the construction of the so-called representative, official district along Mickiewicza, Świętojańska, Wersalska (Akademicka) and Legionowa Streets when a complex of residential buildings called the "clerks' colony" (Polish: Kolonia urzędnicza) was built on Świętojańska Street between 1925 and 1930.

The systematic reconstruction of Białystok's city center began in 1949. The scale of wartime physical destruction and the deaths of many property owners (and the lack of heirs) allowed for far-reaching changes. An inventory conducted by the Voivodeship Office of Liquidation which managed the confisicated property revealed that there were approximately 150,000 square meters of development space in the former ghetto area (mostly in the form of small plots of several hundred square meters). Although more than half required clearing of rubble, this represented great potential for a large-scale construction efforts.

The Workers' Housing Estates Plant was the first to begin building apartment blocks in 1949 in the western part of the former Białystok Ghetto, on Malmeda, Zamenhofa, Nowy Świat, Żydowska, and Różańska Streets. The Voivodeship Jewish Committee agreed to donate abandoned squares for this purpose, and the estate also encompassed the areas of Biała, Brańska, Spółdzielcza, Łódzka, Piotrkowska, and then 1 Maja Streets (today Sienkiewicza). The ZOR housing estate (Polish: Osiedle Z.O.R) were three- to four-story, plastered buildings with hipped roofs. The layout of the ZOR housing estate buildings took into consideration the planned W-Z Route (later Aleja 1 Maja, now Piłsudskiego Avenue).

== Streets, squares and districts ==
Akademicka – odd (no buildings), Aleja Zakochanych, Armatnia, Artyleryjska, Biała, Bohaterów Getta, Botaniczna, Branickiego Jana Klemensa – even(no buildings), Bulwar Józefa Blicharskiego, Bulwary Kościałkowskiego, Cieszyńska – odd, Cygańska, Częstochowska, Czysta, Dąbrowskiego Jana Henryka, dr Ireny Białówny, Elektryczna – even building 12, odd 13-17, Grajewska, Grochowa, Kalinowskiego Konstantego, Kijowska – even, Kilińskiego Jana, Kościelna – even 2-8, odd 3, Krakowska – odd, Ks. Adama Abramowicza, Liniarskiego Władysława, Lipowa, Legionowa – even, Malmeda Icchoka, Marjańskiego Józefa, Mickiewicza Adama – even 2-2C, odd 1-5, Młynowa – even 2-36, odd 7-17, Nowy Świat, Odeska, Ołowiana, Piękna, Piłsudskiego Józefa, Piotrkowska, Plac Branickich, Plac Jana Pawła II – building 1, Plac Niepodległości im. R. Dmowskiego, Plac Niezależnego Zrzeszenia Studentów, Poleska – odd 51-87, Północna, Proletariacka, Przejazd, Rynek Kościuszki, Sienkiewicza Henryka – even 4-26, odd 1-9, Skłodowskiej-Curie Marii – even building 2, odd building 1, Sosnkowskiego Oskara - even (no buildings) Spółdzielcza, Suraska, Świętojańska, św. Mikołaja, św. Rocha – even, Waryńskiego Ludwika, Włókiennicza, Zamenhofa Ludwika, Żabia, Żytnia.

== Points of interest ==
In Białystok–Centrum, points of interest include:

- Branicki Palace, housing the Medical University of Białystok, and Branicki park complex
- Cathedral Basilica of the Assumption of the Blessed Virgin Mary with the Renaissance old Parish church
- St. Roch's Church, a Historic Monument of Poland
- Town Hall (at present Podlasie Museum)
- Kościuszko Square (Rynek Kościuszki) with the Józef Piłsudski Monument
- Baroque Branicki Guest Palace
- Cekhauz, former arsenal, formerly housed the state archive
- Aleksandr Węgierki Drama Theatre in Białystok
- Army Museum in Białystok
- Orthodox Cathedral of St. Nicholas
- Orthodox Church of St. Mary Magdalene
- St. Wincent Sisters of Mercy Monastery
- Białystok Puppet Theatre
- Monument to Heroes of the Białystok region
- Rev. Jerzy Popiełuszko Monument
- Ludwik Zamenhof Monument
- Former Masonic Lodge
- Jadwiga Dziekońska Park
- Planty Park
- Poniatowski Park
- Central Park
- Boulevard of Józef Bilcharski
- Kościałkowski Boulevards
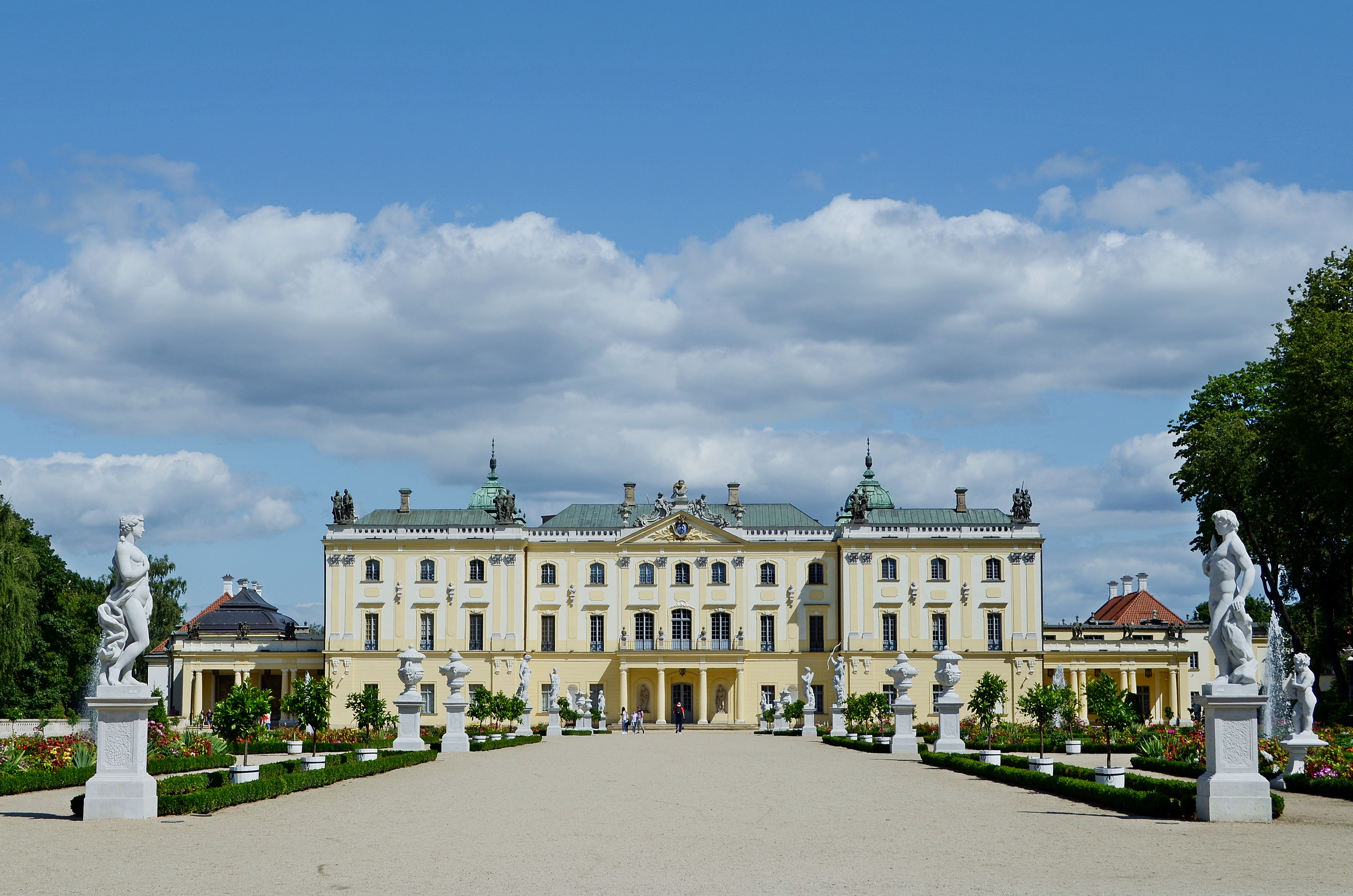
Branicki Palace

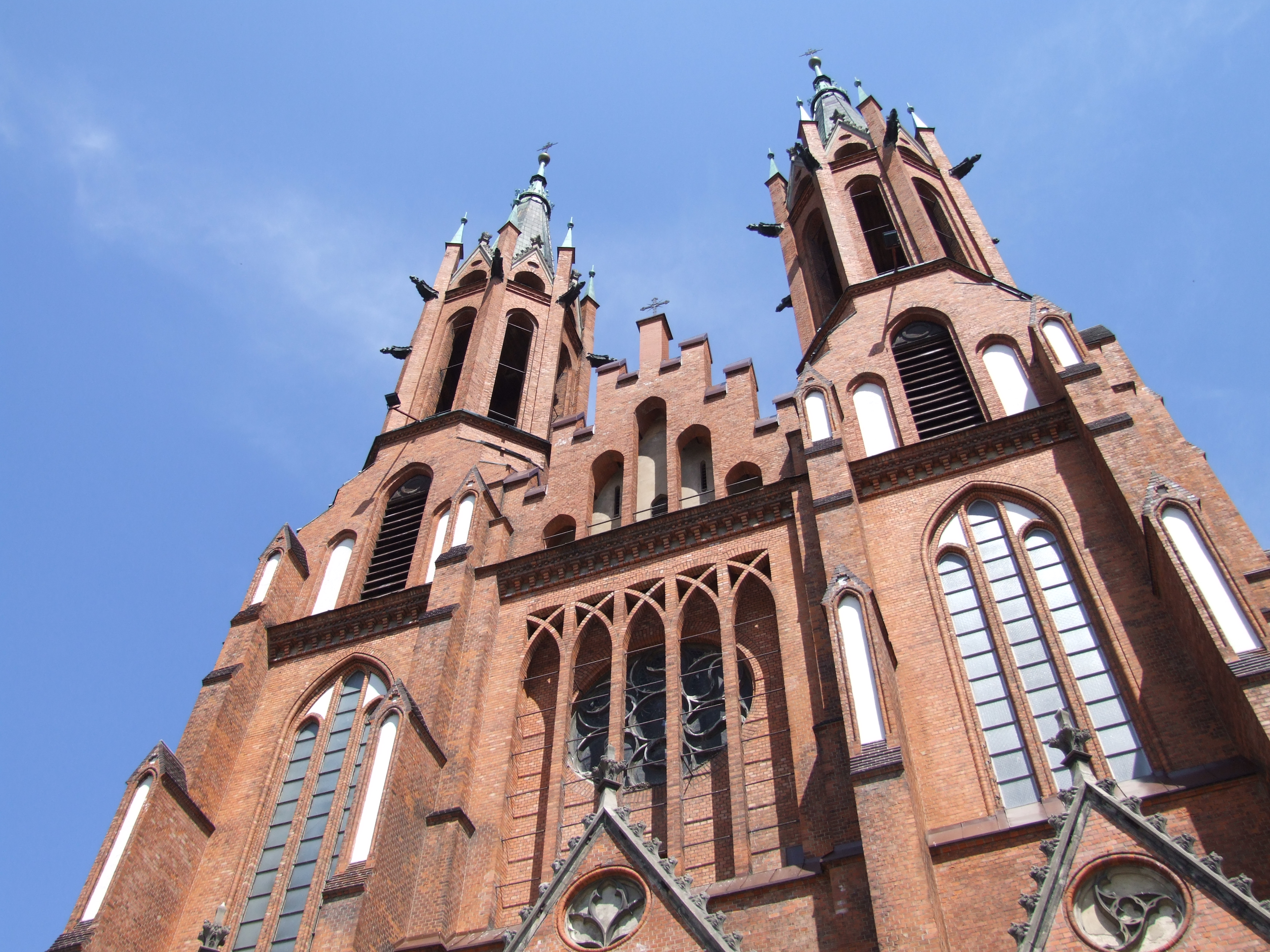
Białystok Cathedral

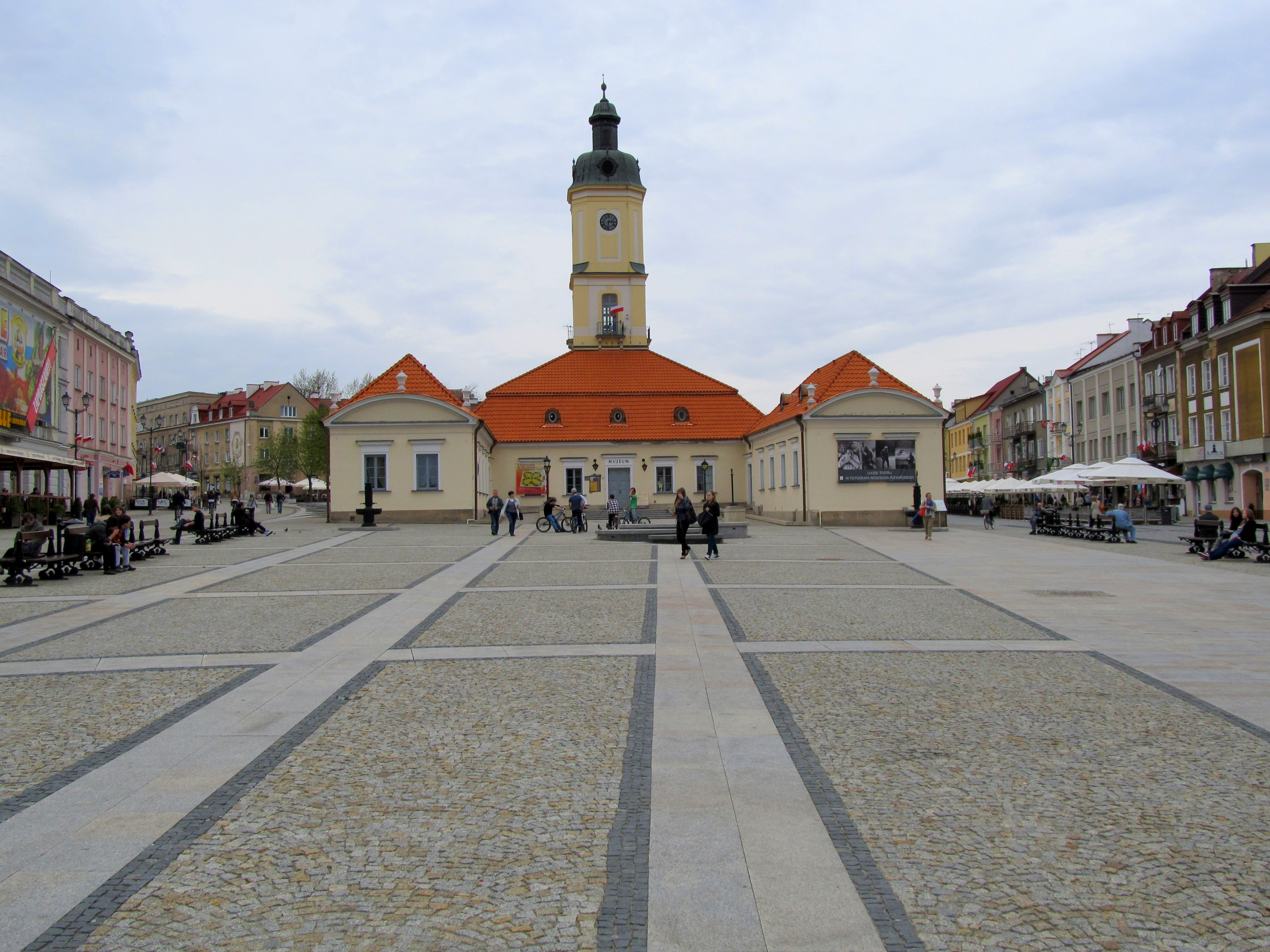
Kościuszko Square with the Baroque town hall

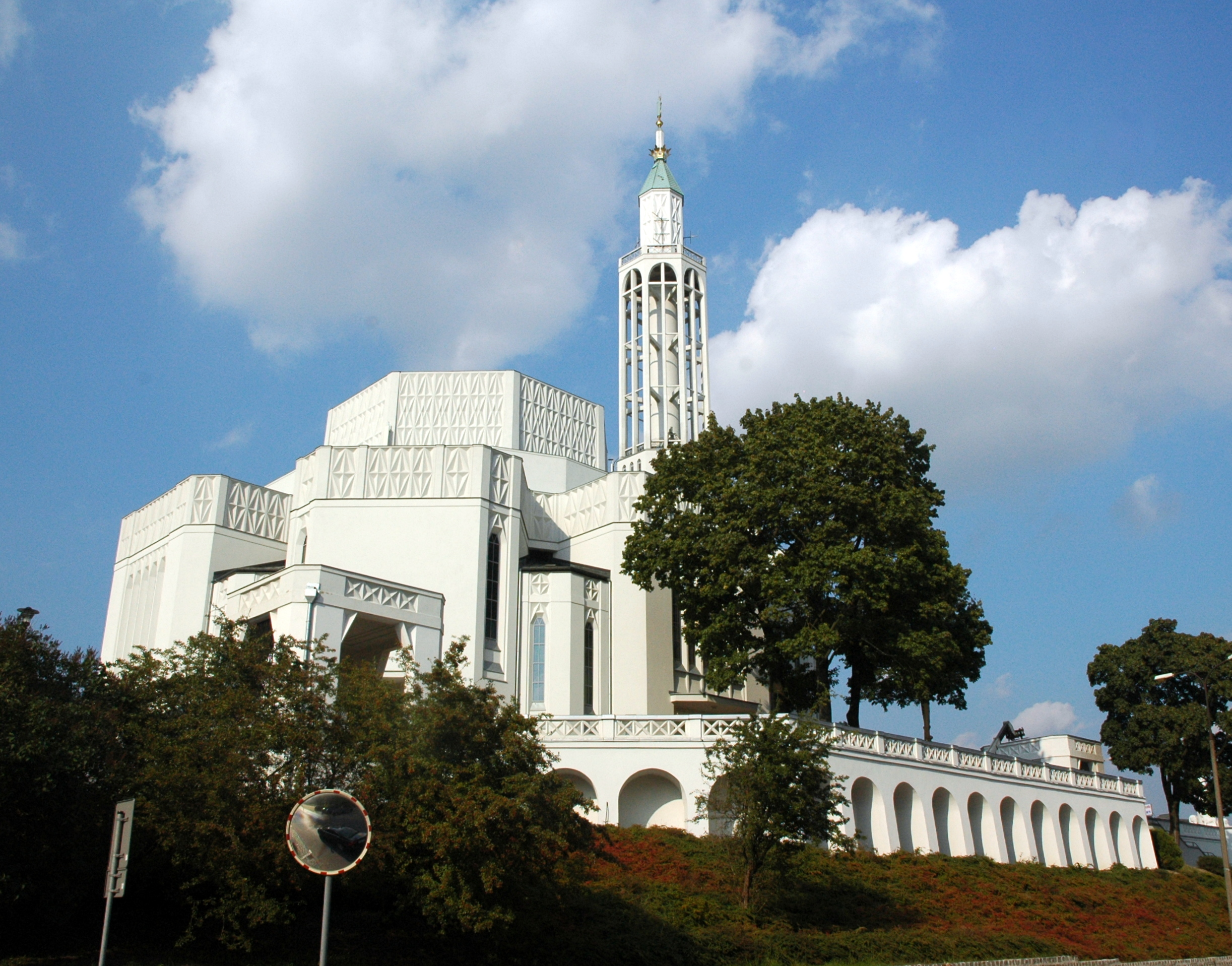
St. Roch's Church
