= Orthodox Church of the Holy Spirit in Białystok =

- Cerkiew Świętego Ducha w Białymstoku
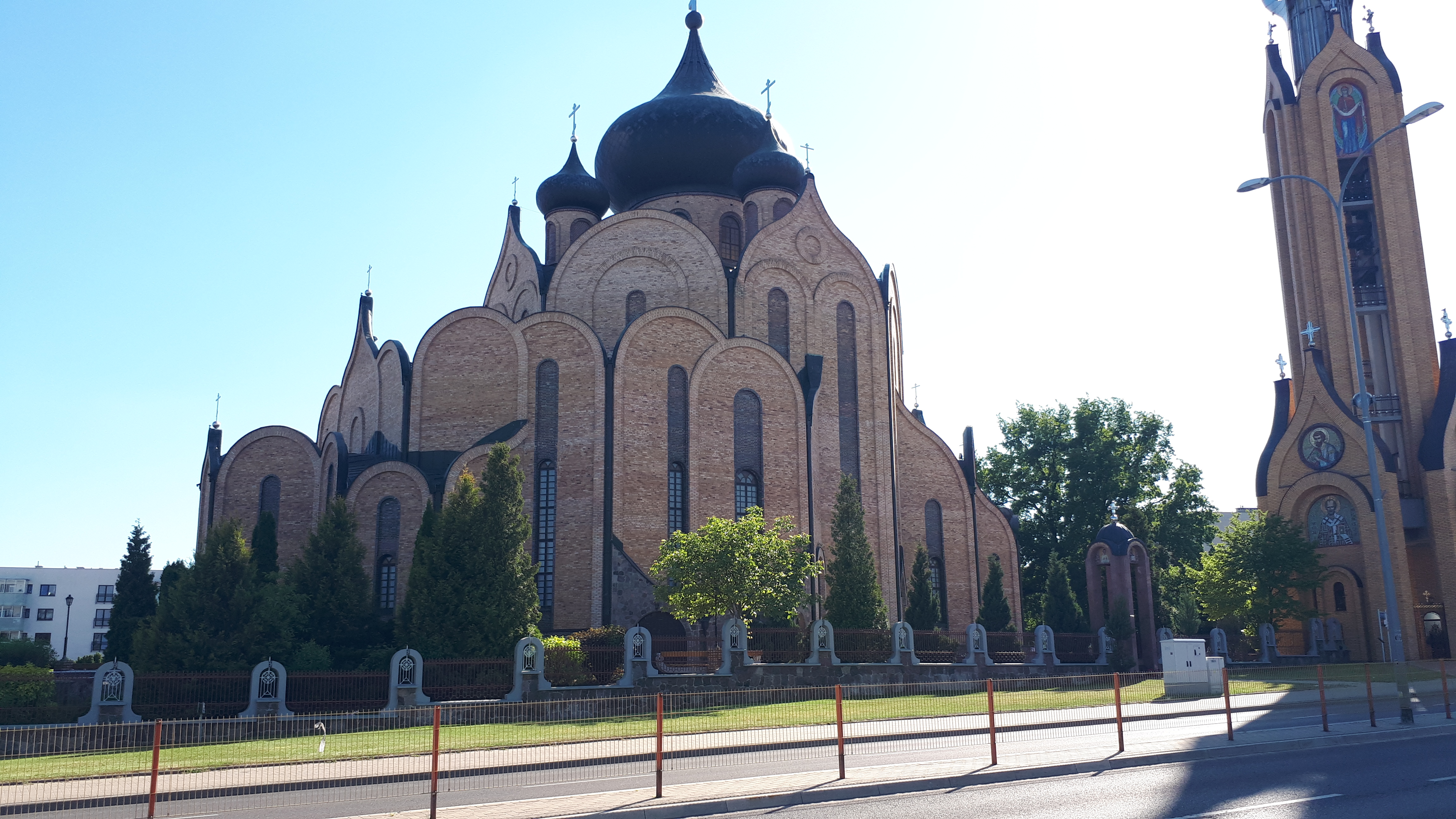
- Orthodox Church of the Holy Spirit in Białystok
- 53°08′48.02″N 23°07′17.9″E
- Location: 13 Antoniuk Fabryczny Street, Wysoki Stoczek District, Białystok
- Denomination: Eastern Orthodox
- Website: swietegoducha.cerkiew.pl

History
- Founded: 1982
- Consecrated: 16 May 1999; 2010

Architecture
- Architect: Jan Kabac
- Style: Byzantine architecture
- Groundbreaking: 1 August 1982

Specifications
- Capacity: 3,000
- Height: approx. 60m

Administration
- Diocese: Białystok and Gdańsk
- Deanery: Białystok

Clergy
- Vicar(s): Mirosław Filimoniuk; Władysław Masajło; Andrzej Popławski; Piotr Omelczuk

Orthodox Church of the Holy Spirit (Polish: Cerkiew Świętego Ducha w Białymstoku) is an Orthodox parish church in Białystok, Podlaskie Voivodeship. It is under the jurisdiction of the Białystok Deanery of the Diocese of Białystok and Gdańsk of the Polish Orthodox Church. It is located in the Wysoki Stoczek district, at 13 Antoniuk Fabryczny Street.

== History ==
From the 1970s, the Diocese of Białystok and Gdańsk sought permission to build a new church in Białystok, pointing out that the already existing active churches (St. Starosielce and the church of St. Elijah in Dojlidy) were not sufficient for the needs of the increasing number of believers emigrating to the city from the countryside. However, the requests of the Białystok Archbishop Nikanor and the parish priest of St. Nicholas, Serafim Żeleźniakowicz, for including the church in the plans of church construction were rejected by the Provincial Office in November 1972, March 1974, December 1976, December 1977 and May 1980. Efforts to build the temple were continued from 1981 by the new Bialystok bishop Sawa (Hrycuniak). As the hierarch recalled, he demanded from the authorities to designate a place for the church, stating that otherwise, he would start trying to regain the plot at Sienkiewicza Street, where the Cathedral of the Resurrection of Christ used to be located, and where, after its demolition, the building of the Voivodeship Police Headquarters was built. In February 1981, Bishop Sawa received information that the plan of erecting the church was included in the church construction plan for the following year. The new church, however, was not to have the status of a parish church, but to be a branch of the cathedral council.

Together with Fr. Żeleźniakowicz and architect Jan Kabac, Bishop Sawa then began searching for the most suitable place for the new temple. Among the faithful and the clergy there were divided opinions in this respect, three locations were considered - in Antoniuk, Wygoda and Kopernika Street. The choice of the first place was decided by the Bishop of Białystok. In December 1981, a plot of land at Antoniuk Fabryczny Street was purchased. As it turned out that people lived in the area, the parish paid for new apartments for them. In the first stage of work, the construction was not well received by the local residents. Their complaint was submitted to the Białystok Voivode, stating that the Orthodox Church "will become a cause of excessive noise" and will cause unnecessary confusion. Already during the construction, the unfinished building was set on fire three times.

The cornerstone, in which, next to the foundation act, stones from the Church of the Holy Sepulchre, Jordan and Athos were placed, and the bishop of Bialystok and Gdańsk Sawa consecrated the construction of the church on August 1, 1982. He also entrusted the duties of supervising the construction of Serafim Żeleźniakowicz. During the construction works, a temporary chapel operated in the vicinity of the future temple

The church was consecrated on May 16, 1999, on the patronal feast. The ceremony was attended by the metropolitan of Warsaw and all of Poland, Sawa, bishops of Lublin and Chełm, Abel, Białystok and Gdańsk, Jakub, Bielsko, Grzegorz (Charkiewicz), and Artemiusz (Kiszczanka), bishop of Grodno and Wołkowysk (Belarusian Exarchate of the Moscow Patriarchate).

Four years after the temple was consecrated, work on the fresco complex began inside that was done with a group of selected iconographers from Donetsk, under the direction of Vladimir Telichko. Artists from Donetsk were the first to make the Eucharist fresco in the altar room, depicting the eternity of the sacrament shown.

== Overview ==
Designed by Jan Kabac, erected since the 1980s and consecrated in 1999, the church is the largest Orthodox church in Poland. It is a single-nave, five-domed building with two altars. The entire architectural concept of the church is based on the symbolism of the Descent of the Holy Spirit. The walls and domes were shaped like tongues of fire. The church has five domes that refer to the figure of Jesus Christ and the four evangelists. The church nave was laid out on an octagon plan with an area of over 800 square meters. From the east, there is an altar room divided into a part with a main altar and a side altar (its patron is Saint Sava).

The furnishing of its interior is modern, but made on the basis of traditional patterns of Orthodox church art. The frescoes in the temple were made by a team of iconographers from Donetsk under the direction of Vladimir Telichko.
