= St. Roch's Church, Białystok =

St. Roch's Church in Białystok
- Bazylika św. Rocha w Białymstoku
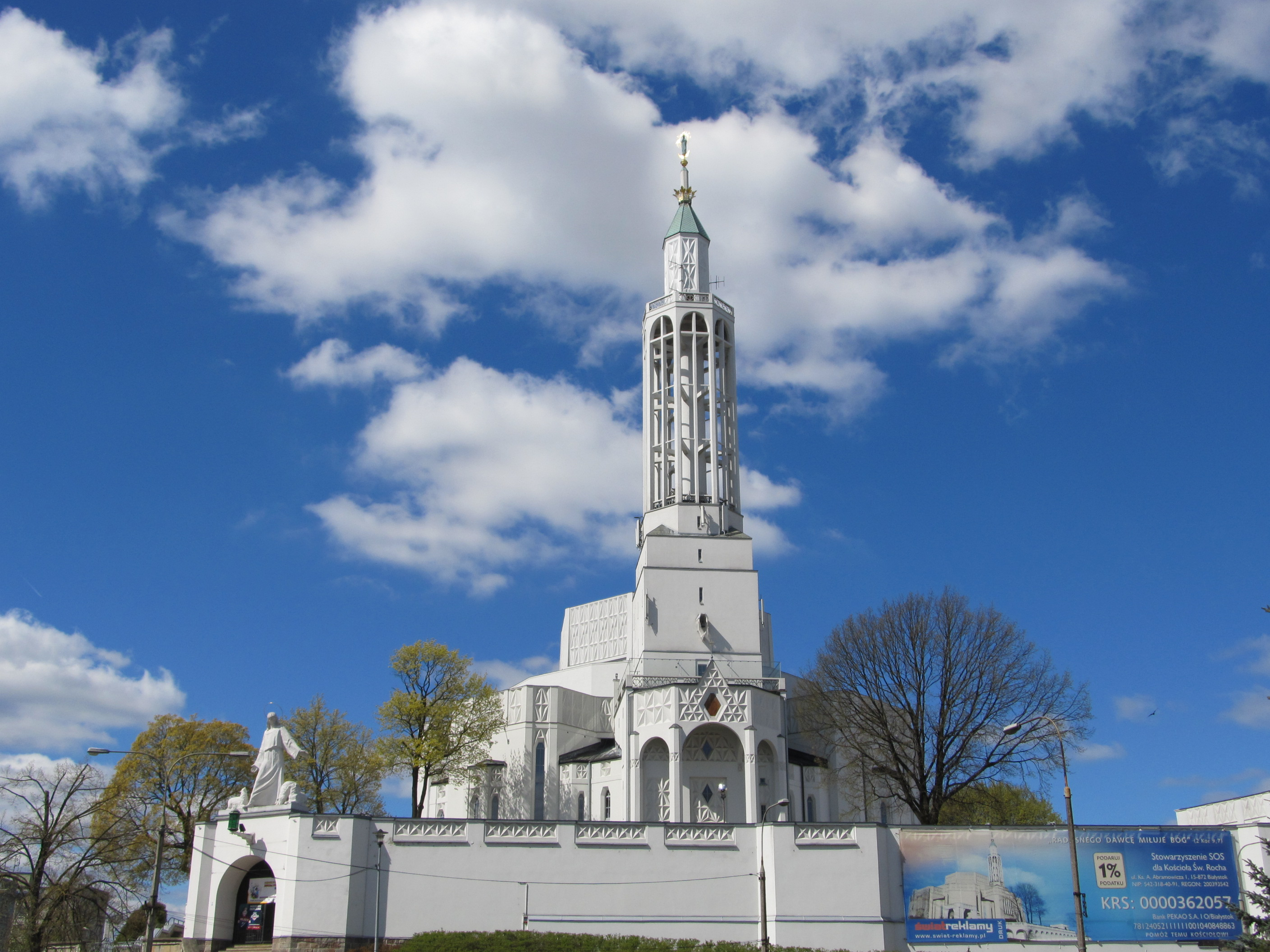
- St. Roch's Church in Białystok
- 53°08′04.5″N 23°08′40.5″E
- Location: 1 Księdza Adama Abramowicza, Centrum District, Białystok
- Website: www.swroch.bialystok.opoka.org.pl

Architecture
- Style: Modernism

Specifications
- Height: 78 m

Historic Monument of Poland
- Designated: 17 January 2019

St. Roch Roman Catholic Church in Białystok, Poland was built between 1927 and 1946 in a modernistic style, designed by renowned Polish architect, professor Oskar Sosnowski. Its official name is Church-Monument of Poland's Regained Independence (Kościoł-Pomnik Odzyskania Niepodległości) and it stands on the Saint Roch hill on Lipowa Street in Białystok, in the spot where a Roman Catholic cemetery, founded in 1839, once stood. The cemetery was profaned by the Russians during the January Uprising.

== History ==
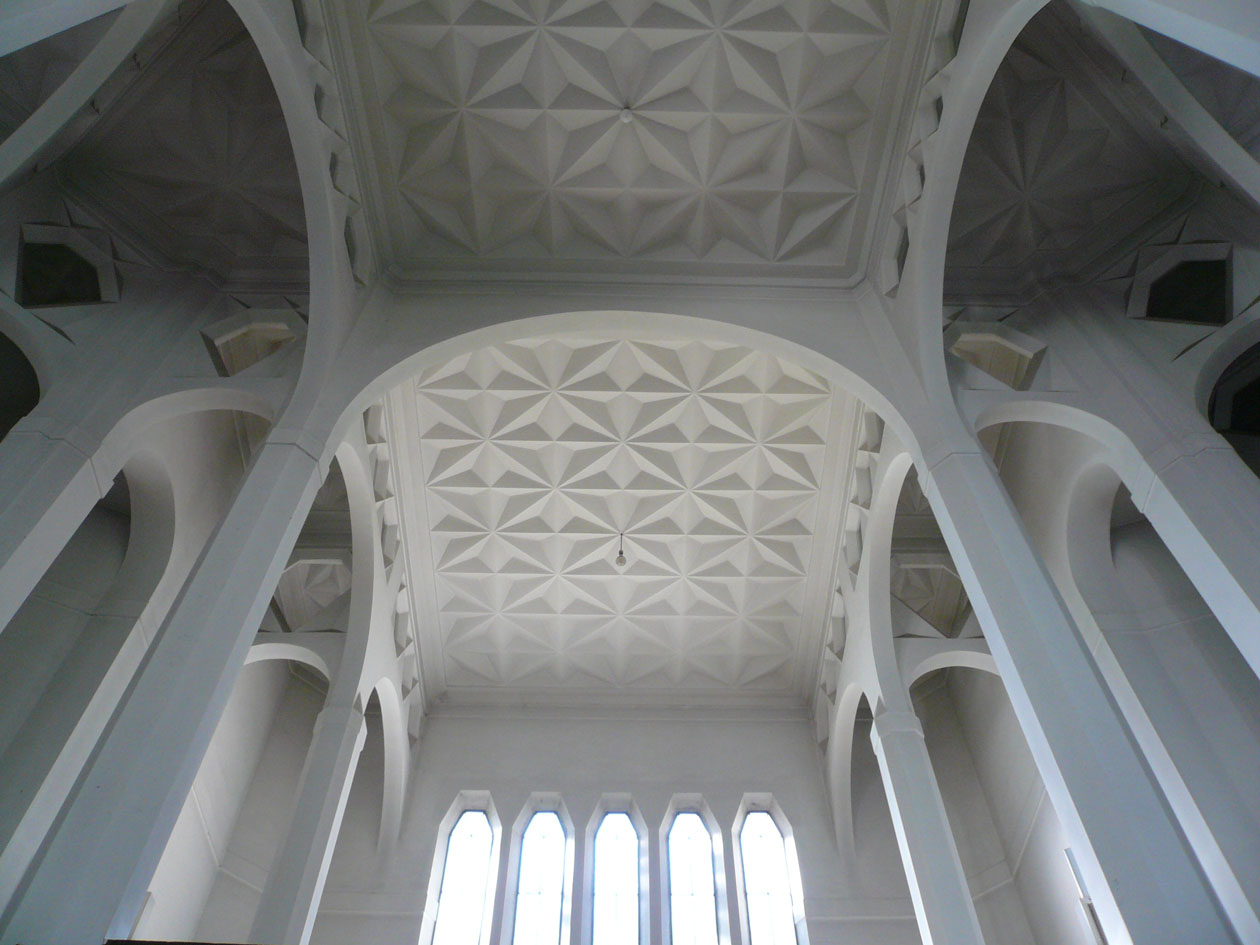
Interior

The postulate to build a church on a hill dominating the city center has been submitted by the faithful for many decades. However, such an exposed location could not be approved by the tsarist governorate authorities, which consistently refused to consent to subsequent petitions on this matter. The plans were resumed in the independent Republic of Poland, when the newly erected parish was taken over by Father Adam Abramowicz. In cooperation with the Circle of Architects in Warsaw, at the initiative of local provost, reverend Adam Abramowicz, in April 1926 a competition was announced for a new church on St. Roch in Białystok. It contained an unequivocal postulate about the symbolic idea of the building, which was to have the dimension of a monument as "a monument to the revival of the independence of the Fatherland". The competition became an important event in the artistic life of the interwar Polish Republic and played an important role in the development of modern Polish architectural thought. Among 70 complex works, formally and stylistically diverse, there are several bold design concepts, operating in an avant-garde form and innovative spatial solutions. The commission, composed of Karol Jankowski, Marian Lalewicz and Czesław Przybylski, as well as priest Adam Abramowicz and district architect J. Kummant, at the meeting on July 7, 1926 awarded the first prize to the team: Władysław Schwarzenberg-Czerny, Jan Karżewski and Jerzy Woyzbun. Moreover, three other projects were awarded prizes, among which the most radical avant-garde proposals were presented by the winners of the fourth prize: Bohdan Lachert, Józef Szanajca and Lech Niemojewski. None of the four awarded works received the final approval of the Construction Committee. The concept of Oskar Sosnowski, selected in a second, closed competition, was sent for implementation. Sosnowski's project was part of the original intention of the so-called Stone Litany: mystical Marian fortresses, architectural equivalents of the invocations of the Loreto litany. The vision of the temple as a monument-votive offering for regained independence was combined in Sosnowski's project with a hymn in honor of Our Lady, Queen of the Polish Crown, and the call from the litany became at the same time a clear symbol of the new reality. The works began in 1927 and despite the huge financial difficulties, the construction progressed quickly, which was a real phenomenon, considering the extremely difficult economic realities and the complex social reality of Białystok at that time.

The church is planned as an octahedron, with three masses set on one another. The first mass makes the main part of the complex, the additional two are located on the sides, making the attics. Originally, the church was commemorated to Mary, symbolized with a star, therefore Sosnowski used stars in his design, especially in elements of the vault. After his death (September 1939, during German siege of Warsaw), the construction was continued by another architect, Stanislaw Bukowski. During the Soviet occupation of eastern Poland during World War II (September 1939 - June 1941), Soviet authorities planned to open a circus in the unfinished building.

The church has an impressive, 83-meter tower, which is modeled after that of the Cathedral in Kamianets-Podilskyi. On the top, there is a 3-meter figure of Mary, which stands on a Piast-style crown. The vaults resemble traditional vaults found in houses of northeastern part of Poland. Near the church there is a rectory, also designed by Sosnowski. The whole complex is surrounded by walls, in reference to the tradition of fortified churches, common in eastern Poland.
