= Orthodox Church of the Divine Wisdom in Białystok =

Church of Divine Wisdom in Białystok
- Cerkiew Mądrości Bożej w Białymstoku
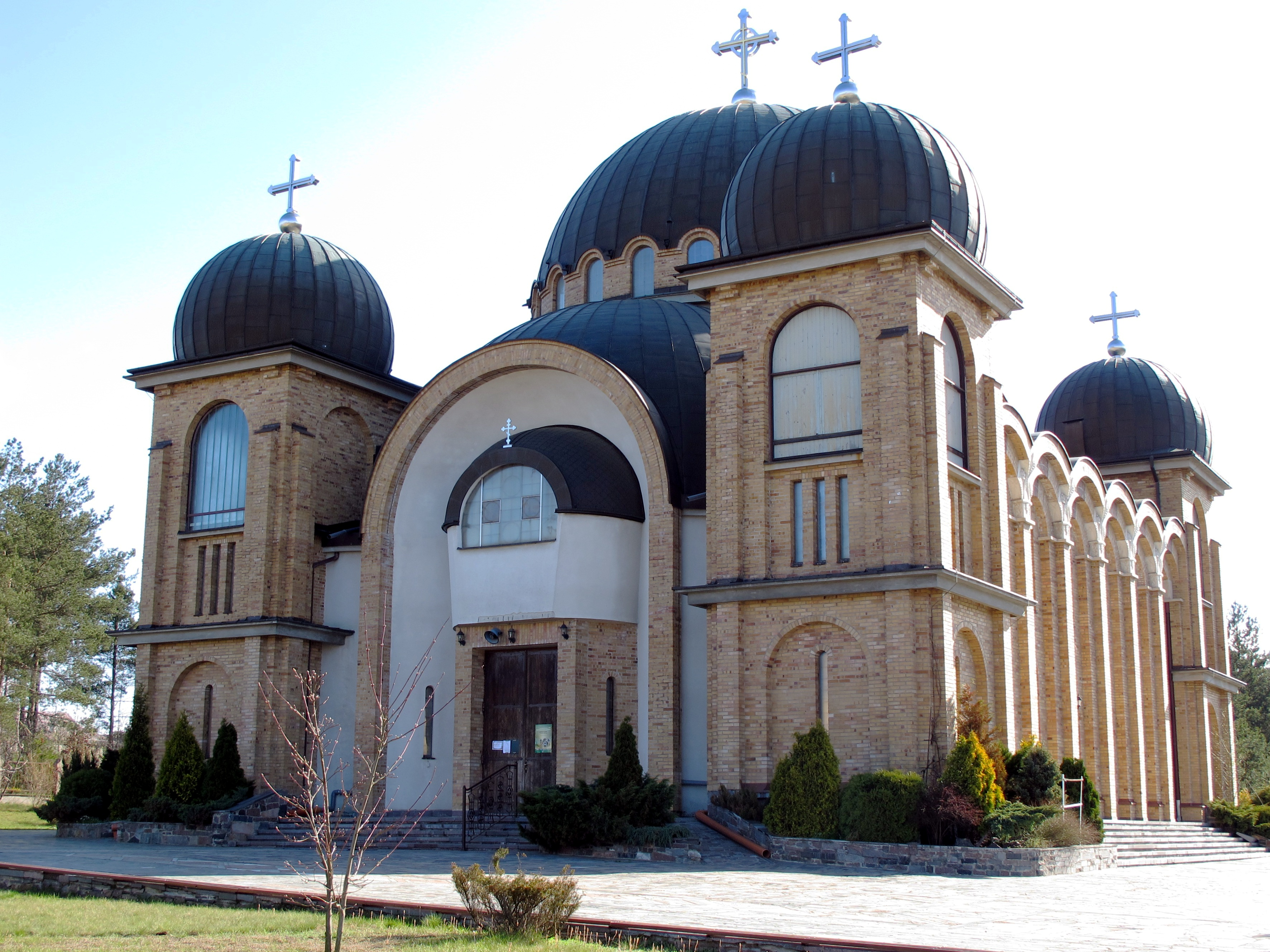
- Church of Divine Wisdom in Białystok
- 53°09′20″N 23°12′04″E
- Location: 5 Trawiasta street, Wygoda District, Białystok
- Denomination: Eastern Orthodox
- Website: hagiasophia.cerkiew.pl

History
- Consecrated: 15 October 1998

Architecture
- Architect: Michał Bałasz
- Style: Byzantine architecture
- Groundbreaking: 1987
- Completed: 1998

Specifications
- Capacity: 1500
- Length: 32.5 m
- Height: 17m

Administration
- Diocese: Białystok and Gdańsk
- Deanery: Białystok

Church of Divine Wisdom (Hagia Sophia) (Polish: Cerkiew Mądrości Bożej w Białymstoku) Orthodox parish church in Białystok. It belongs to the Białystok Deanery of the Diocese of Białystok-Gdańsk of the Polish Autocephalous Orthodox Church. The church is located in the Wygoda District, at Trajawa Street.

== History ==
The act of foundation and consecration of the cornerstone for the construction of the new church took place on November 20, 1987, during the stay of the Patriarch of Constantinople Demetrios I in the Białystok Voivodeship. The following year, on September 17, the solemn consecration of the foundations of the new church took place, performed by Archbishop Sawa. On October 15, 1998, the solemn consecration of the church took place. The first Holy Liturgy in the church under construction was celebrated in September 1994. Since April 7, 1996, all parish services have been celebrated in the church. The church was consecrated by Patriarch Bartholomew I of Constantinople together with Metropolitan of Warsaw and All Poland Sawa Hrycuniak on October 15, 1998.

Since 2008, the church hosts concerts of choirs that are winners of the International Festival "Hajnówka Days of Orthodox Church Music", as well as concerts as part of the Serbian Culture Festival "Vidovdan".

In August 2018, the church was visited by Metropolitan Tikhon of All America and Canada, the head of the Orthodox Church in America.

== Architecture ==
The author of the church design is Michał Bałasz. It was modeled on the Hagia Sophia church in Constantinople. The frescoes were made by a four-person group of painters from Greece: prof. Konstantinos Xenopoulos, Konstantinos Tzitzilis and the married couple Leonidas and Maria Tsauparoglou. The polychrome in the dome of the building is a gift from the Patriarchate of Constantinople to the church, while the polychrome in the altar part is a private offering of painters. The church was built on a rectangular plan with dimensions of 32.5 × 22.5 m. The total height of the building (from the floor to the highest point of the central dome) is 17 m. The facades are made of clinker brick. On the northern and southern walls, patterns were created from panels and pilasters, turning into interpenetrating arches.

The church has five domes (the largest - central and four smaller ones) covered with copper sheet and topped with crosses. The central dome has a diameter of 16 m, and the cross crowning it is 4 m high. The body of the church is shaped according to a vertical axis, defined by the highest point of the central dome. This dome is supported by arcade arches and pendentives. The horizontal axis is marked by two semi-domes and rows of columns separating the main nave from the side naves. There are balconies above the side aisles. In order to maintain appropriate acoustics in the church, a contrapse was placed in the western apse, thanks to which there are no reverberations or echoes.

The church has a single-row iconostasis (the arches of which are made of casts of marble flour), with icons written by the Greek artist Konstantinos Spandinos, which are a gift from the Archbishop of Athens and All Greece, Christodulos. The internal walls (both in the presbytery and in the nave) are decorated with polychromes. The lower parts of the walls are covered with white marble. The floor is made of seven-colored granite, with a central composition depicting a two-headed eagle, the emblem of the Byzantine Empire.

There are seven bells in the church, cast in Voronezh.

The usable area of the church is 625 m^{2}. The church can accommodate 1,500 people.
