= Orthodox Church of St. George in Białystok =

- Cerkiew św. Jerzego w Białymstoku
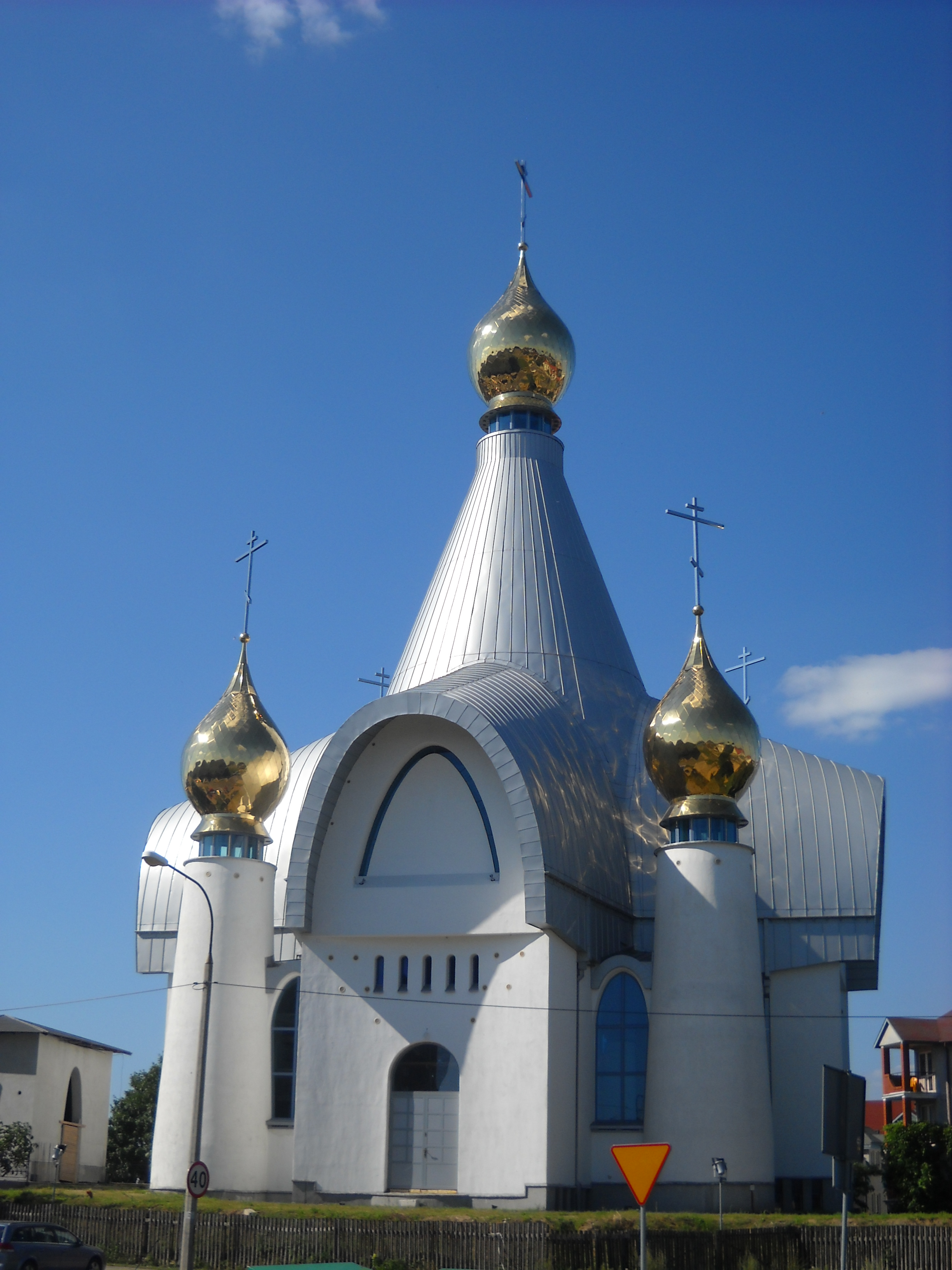
- View of the church in 2011
- Orthodox Church of St. George in Białystok
- 53°06′35″N 23°07′47″E
- Location: 36 Pułaskiego, Nowe Miasto District, Białystok
- Denomination: Eastern Orthodox
- Website: parafia-swietego-jerzego.pl

History
- Consecrated: 17 October 2017

Architecture
- Architect: Jerzy Uścinowicz
- Style: Byzantine architecture
- Groundbreaking: 1998
- Completed: 2007

Administration
- Diocese: Białystok and Gdańsk
- Deanery: Białystok

Orthodox Church of St. George in Białystok (Polish: Cerkiew św. Jerzego w Białymstoku is Orthodox parish church in Białystok. It belongs to the Białystok Deanery of the Diocese of Białystok-Gdańsk of the Polish Autocephalous Orthodox Church. The church is located in the Nowe Miasto District, at 36 Kazimierza Pułaskiego Street.

== History ==
On 14 of September 1996, the parish of St. George, separated from the Saint Nicholas Cathedral parish. The first parish church was a wooden Orthodox church, moved from Czyże.

Cornerstone for the construction of the church of St. George was consecrated on October 15, 1998, by the Patriarch of Constantinople Bartholomew I who was visiting Poland. The design of the church was made by prof. Jerzy Uścinowicz. The cornerstone was laid on May 6, 2000, by Jakub, Bishop of Białystok and Gdańsk. In 2006 (after a year-long break in construction works due to the need to complete the project), the first domes and crosses were erected, consecrated by the Bishops of Białystok and Gdańsk, Jakub, and the Archbishop of Nice, Paweł.

On July 9, 1999, a deed was drawn up at the notary's office, under which the right of perpetual usufruct of the land for the construction of the church was transferred to the parish of St. George in Białystok.

The author of the temple project is the architect Jerzy Uścinowicz. The current parish priest, Grzegorz Misiejuk, took on the task of building a new church from the very beginning. In 2006, during the celebrations of the first crosses on the church domes, together with the ordinary of the diocese, Bishop Jakub, His Excellency Pawel, Bishop of Nice, consecrated the crosses. The consecrated stone stood in the temporary church until May 6, 2000. On the day of the parish's patron saint's feast, after the holiday liturgy, in a solemn procession it was carried to the excavation site and by Bishop Jakub it was bricked into the foundation of the church. On May 5, 2010, Archbishop Jakub of Białystok and Gdańsk consecrated the bells. The next day, the Metropolitan of Warsaw and All Poland, Sawa Hrycuniak, consecrated (assisted by Archbishop Jakub) the lower church in honor of the Protection of the Mother of God. After 2010, plastering and frescoes were started in the upper church, as well as its furnishings.

In July 2016, the icon of St. was placed in the church. Paisius the Hagiorite, written by his disciple, the monk Paisius of the Holy Mount Athos. The celebrations took place on July 11–12; some of them took place under the leadership of the bishop of Supraśl, Grzegorz.

On August 21, 2016, the church was visited by the Orthodox Patriarch of Antioch, John X.

On October 14, 2017, the upper church was consecrated. The ceremony was presided over by the Metropolitan of Warsaw and All Poland, Sawa, assisted by the Archbishop of Białystok and Gdańsk, Jakub, and the Bishop of Supraśl, Andrzej.

On March 22, 2020, during the Sunday service in the church, a police intervention took place in connection with the violation by local believers and Orthodox clergy of the national quarantine introduced by the Polish government as a result of the COVID-19 pandemic in Poland. The anti-epidemic regulations at that time limited the maximum number of participants in public meetings and religious ceremonies to 50 people, but over 70 believers gathered in the church. This event received wide coverage in the nationwide mass media and was the subject of public debate. Preliminary investigation proceedings were initiated against the parish with the aim of taking the case to court. It was one of the two most flagrant cases of violation of sanitary regulations in the Podlaskie Voivodeship.

In October 2021, the 25th anniversary of the parish was celebrated, during which, among others, an open-air exhibition of photographs on the church fence presenting a quarter of a century of history of this place.

== Architecture ==
Church of St. George is a two-story brick building, decorated in a modern style with clear references to traditional Russian-Byzantine architecture.

The church is crowned with five onion-shaped domes, covered with gilded sheets of metal.

=== Upper part ===
There are two altars in the upper church: the main oak altar (placed on the day of the church's consecration, October 14, 2017) and the side altar, dedicated to St. Anatol Męczennik (funded by Father Anatol Siegień). Both iconostases were designed and the icons in them were written by iconographer Jarosław Wiszenko. The interior walls are decorated with frescoes, also by Jarosław Wiszenko. The sculptures for the tsarist gates were made by Wiaczesław Szum from Siemiatycze. Panikadiło was designed by Dr. Tatiana Misijuk, while the design of the granite floor was made by the builder of the church, prof. Jerzy Uścinowicz.

The upper church also contains the relics of Saint, brought from Mount Athos. Barbara and the icon of St. Paisius the Hagiorites.

=== Lower part ===
In the lower church, called the Protection of Our Lady, there is a marble altar and iconostasis. The presbytery is decorated with frescoes made by Joanna and Jarosław Jakimczuk. The same iconographers designed the altar, iconostasis and wrote icons for it. One of them - the Holy Vilnius Martyrs Anthony, John and Eustace - contains the relics of the presented saints. In the lower church there is also an icon of the Three Holy Hierarchs (Basil the Great, Gregory the Theologian and John Chrysostom), which also contains the relics of the presented saints.
