= Lipowa Street, Białystok =

Street in Białystok, Poland

Lipowa Street
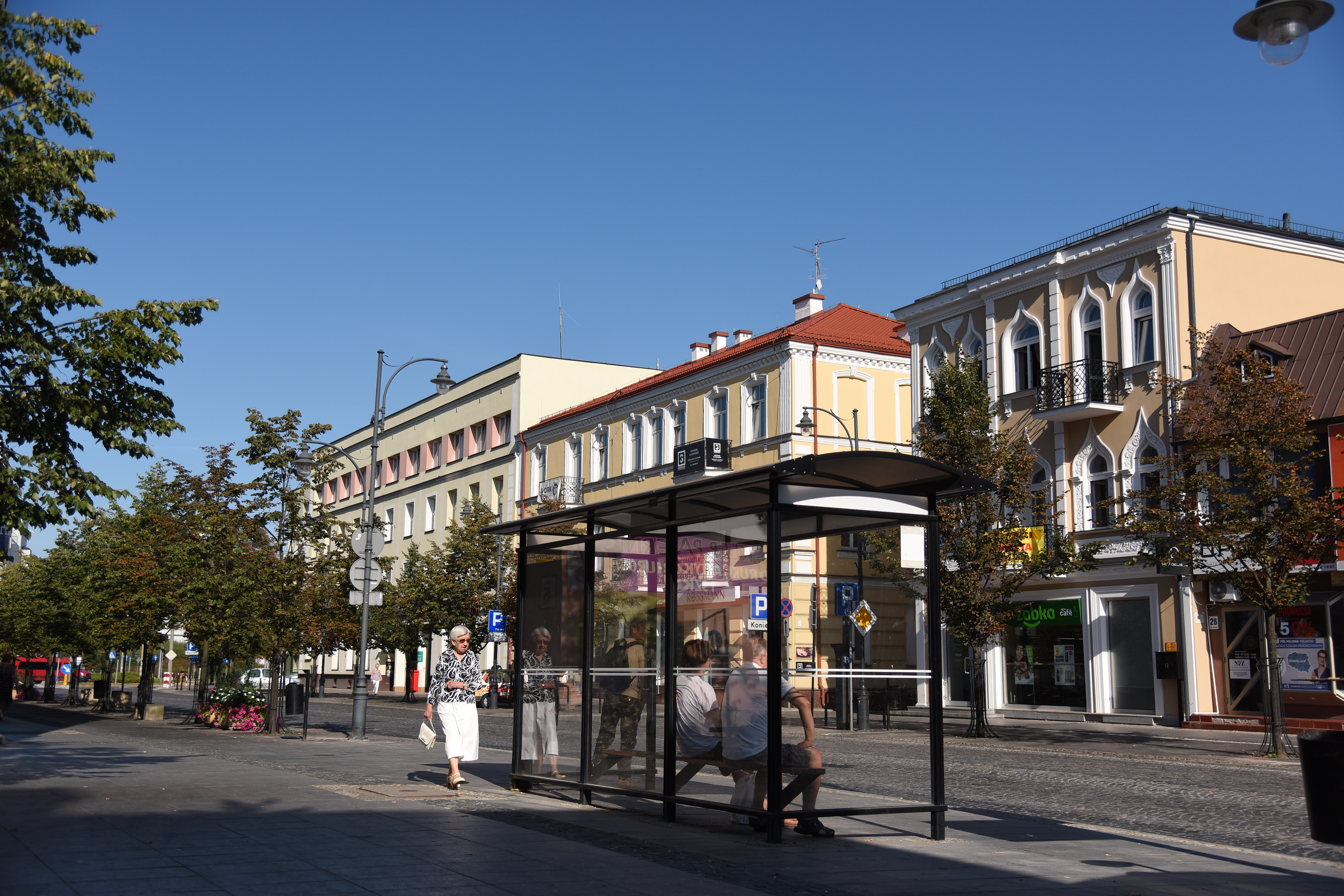
- Lipowa Street in September 2019
- Interactive map of Lipowa Street
- Native name: Ulica Lipowa (Polish)
- Former name(s): Choroska, Nowolipie, Sowiecka, Lindenstrasse, Józefa Stalina
- Type: Street
- Length: 790 m (2,590 ft)
- Location: Centrum District, Białystok, Poland
- Coordinates: 53°7′59″N 23°9′14″E

Lipowa Street is a representative street at the center of Białystok, Poland, running from the Kościuszko Square (corner of Spółdzielcza Street) to Romana Dmowskiego Niepodległości Square (corner of Krakowska street). The street is made up of low buildings mostly of 2-3 floors with various shops, offices and restaurants located at the ground floor.

== Name ==
The name of the street comes from a row of lime which grew here in the 18th-20th centuries. Over the centuries, the name of this exclusive and representative Białystok street in the city center took various names: Choroska, Tykocka, Nowolipie, Lipowa, Józefa Piłsudskiego, Sovetskaya, Lindenstrasse, Józefa Stalina to finally return to its original name after World War II: Lipowa.

== History ==
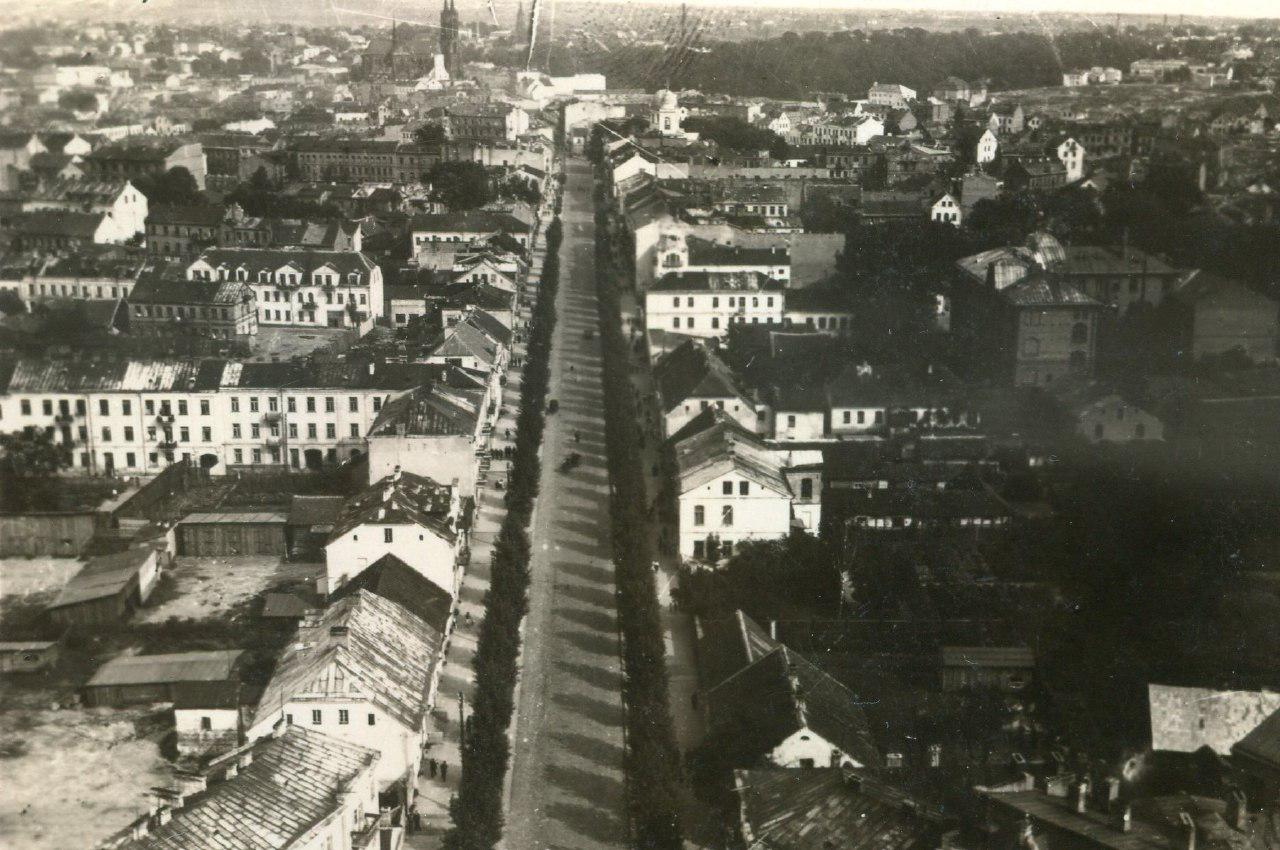
View of the street in 1940, when Białystok became part of the Byelorussian SSR

This street was built in two stages. Its first section led from the market square to today's intersection with Malmeda Street. Since the 16th century, this was the beginning of the route leading to Choroszcz and Tykocin. This road turned further south. Its course more or less coincided with today's streets of Św. Mikolaja, Kalinowskiego, Grunwaldzka. It was not until 1730 that Jan Klemens Branicki, creating the Baroque composition of the city, marked out the current line of this street. With the marking of the new direction of Choroska Street, the importance of the much older and shorter axis, Suraska Street - Wasilkowska - parish church, decreased. The line of Choroska Street, which now passed through Przedmieście Choroskie at a changed angle, became the main axis of the expansion of Białystok due to its good connection with the palace and the New Town. Work on marking out the new course of Choroska Street began in the 1730s. A trace of its former direction was a winding street called in the 1771/72 inventory "ulica Poprzeczna Zatylna ku cerkwi". An additional element of the new development of the street in the spirit of the French Baroque was the planting of four rows of linden trees in 1758, two on each side.

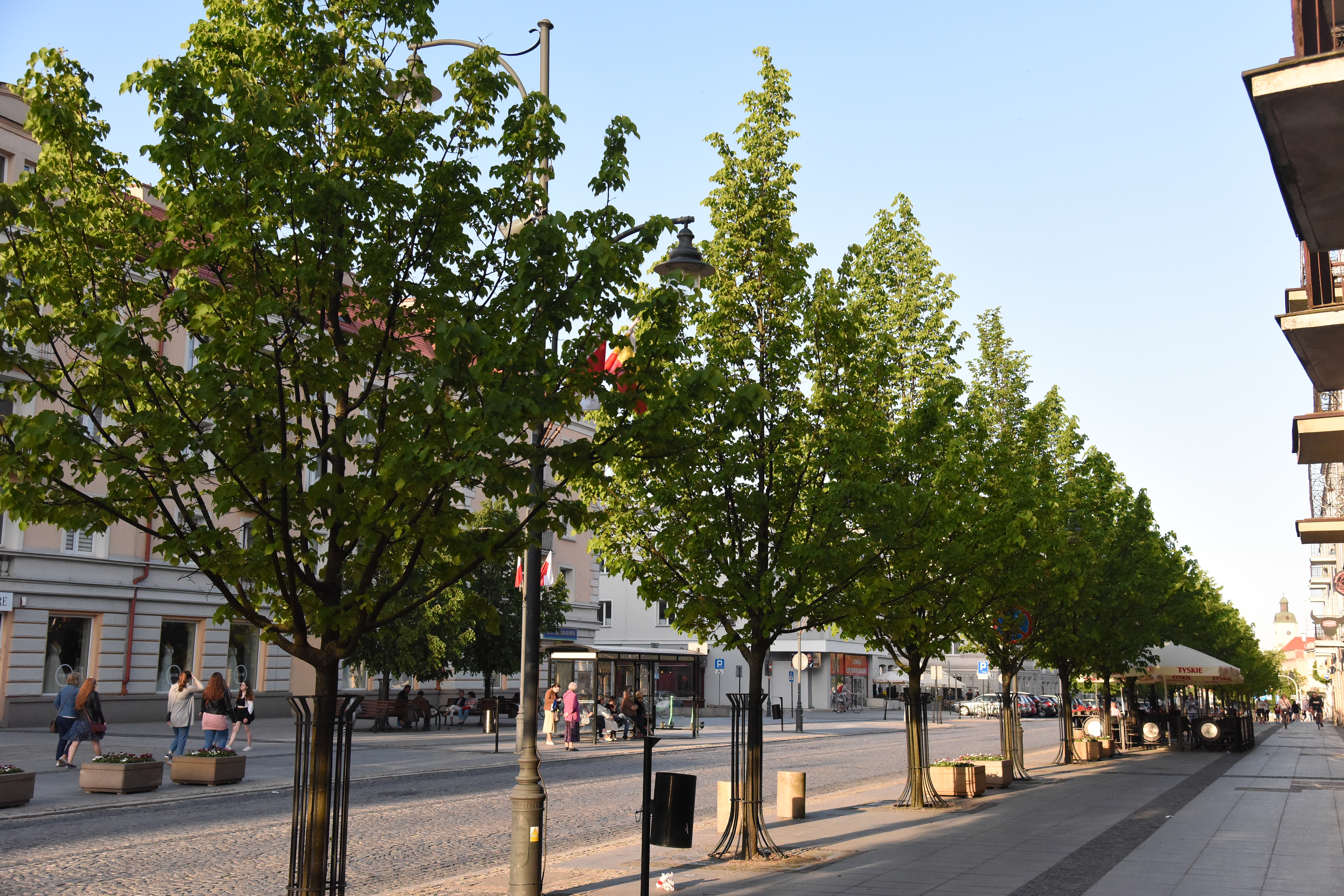
View of the linden avenue in the street, May 2022

Its perspective was closed by St. Roch Hill. However, the name of the street retained a clear division into two parts. The section leaving the market square was inhabited by a dozen or so families, in small wooden houses, whose facades were bricked up and whose roofs were covered with tiles and was closed by a gate placed at the height of the current Orthodox Cathedral of St. Nicholas. Behind the gate, up to St. Roch Hill, Branicki ordered in 1758 to plant linden trees in four rows, reaching almost to St. Roch Hill. This part of the street was called Nowolipie. Construction work in Nowolipie street was still being carried out there in the 1750s. At that time, a promenade mill was built according to the design of Ricound de Tiweqaille, modelled on a similar mill operating in Warsaw.

In the mid-18th century, Choroska Street was built up on both sides. At its end stood the spacious Włokowicz drive-in inn (in this place there is now the Cristal Hotel). Nowolipie had the character of a suburb, inhabited mainly by farmers. There were two breweries and a mill, the so-called promenade. In 1799, almost the entire southern side of Nowolipie was built up, and in the northern side the buildings reached half of its length. In 1810, houses stood along the entire street. It had a regularly shaped frontages, separated by rows of lime trees, made a great impression. In the mid-19th century, the city limits absorbed Nowolipie. The name Lipowa began to be used at that time. In the second half of the 19th century, the name Tykocka began to be used in reference to Choroska Street.

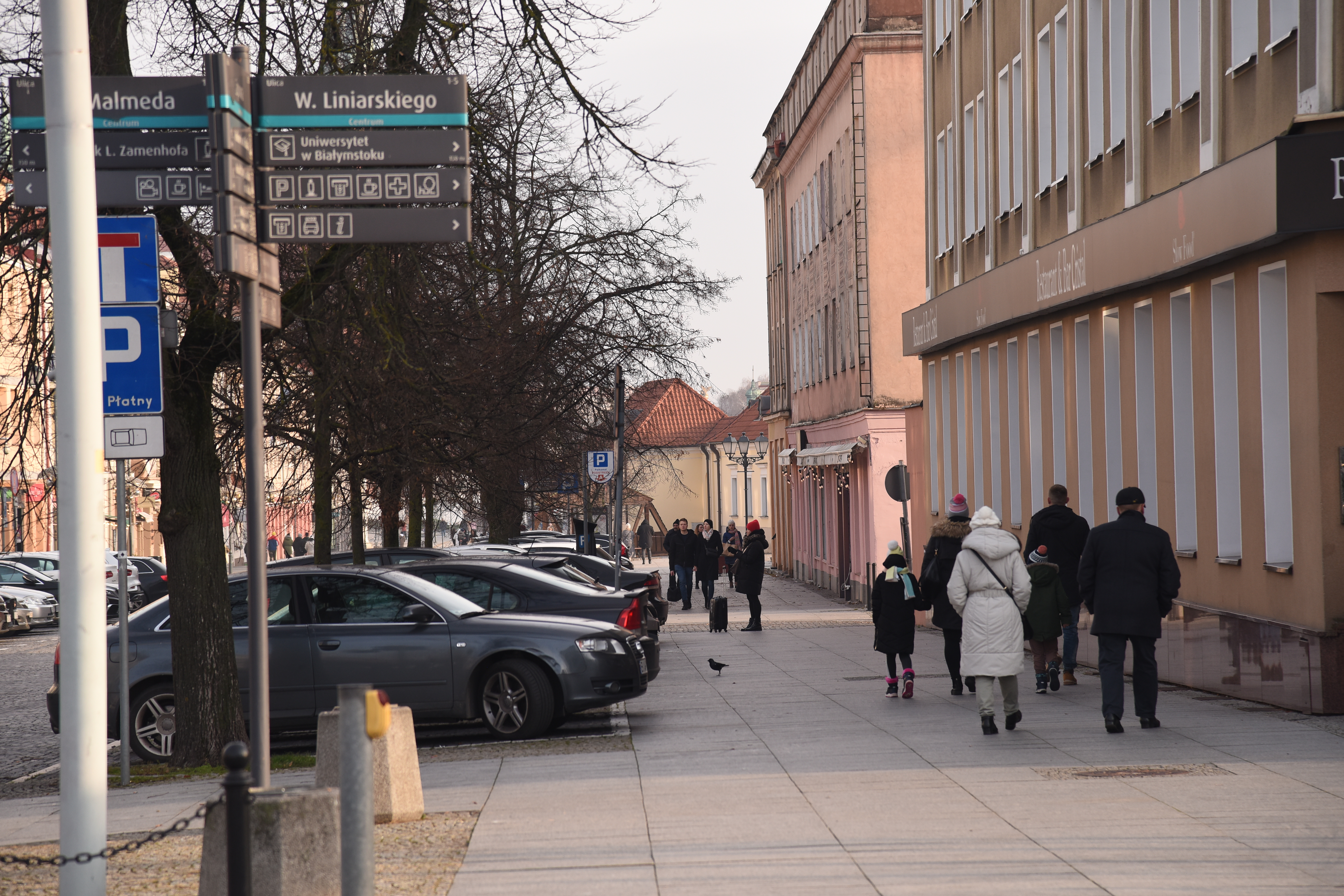
The initial section of Lipowa Street adjoining Kościuszko Market Square.

In 1852, the District Hospital (No. 43) was opened on Lipowa Street. On the other side of the street stood the House of the Gentry (Polish: Dom Ziemiaństwa), where numerous county offices and social organizations had their seats. In the last decades of the 19th century, Lipowa became the largest shopping arcade in the city. The wealthiest townspeople, mainly Jews, built representative tenement houses along them. One of them belonged to Boruch Gwin, currently the Cristal Hotel stands in this place. In the years 1912-1915 it housed the editorial office of the Gazeta Białostocka, whose editor and publisher was Konstanty Kosinski. One of the most impressive buildings was the Trylling tenement house, standing on the corner of Lipowa and Nowy Świat. The owner of the corner tenement house on Lipowa and Kupiecka (modern Malmeda) was Józef Karol Puchalski, the first temporary president of Białystok in 1919. Chaim Ber Zakhejm had his house between these tenement houses. It housed the Białystok Commercial Bank, established in 1897.

In August 1897, when Tsar Nicholas II and his wife visited Białystok, the triumphal arch on Lipowa Street near St. Roch Hill was removed. This rather cheap structure, made of wood and plywood, was dismantled only in 1904. One of the reasons for its removal was a dramatic event in July of that year, when a terrorist act took place under the arch. As a result of a bomb explosion, 46-year-old Emma Hampel died. The arch was seriously damaged, and the force of the explosion caused 50 windows in the surrounding buildings to be broken. More terrorist and criminal actions took place in the street at the onset of the new century. In 1903, Białystok police chief Matlenka was shot at the street. In 1905, bandits shot through the windows of the bank office in Trylling's house, severely wounding the cashier Josel Goldszmidt. In the same year, a bandit attack took place in Puchalski's tenement house when unknown perpetrators, under the pretext of looking for work, severely beat the merchant M. Cejtkin. In 1906, a bomb was thrown into the hairdressing salon in Ginzburg's house, and a dozen or so days later, the owner of the office, Jankiel Zilberblat, was killed. Less than a month later, at high noon on Tykocka Street, Leonid Genke, a correspondent of the "Moscow News", was shot, wounding him with two bullets in the back.

Following the regaining of independence of Poland and the creation of the Second Polish Republic, the street kept its important status and its character didn't change. During the existence of the Second Polish Republic its name was changed to Piłsudskiego.

During the Soviet occupation of the city, its name, together with the Kościuszko Market Square changed to Sovetskaya. During the German occupation, the streets adjoining the northern side of the street became part of the Białystok Ghetto, with one of the gates to it located at the intersection of Lipowa and Malmeda streets. In July 1944, just before the Wehrmacht retreated from the city, it burned and destroyed most of the street, with few surviving buildings.

After the war, the street, together with the entire center of the city was re-built. In 2012 the street was reconstructed and parking lots at some of its sections were cancelled, a move criticized by some of the business owners in the area.

== Buildings ==
Moving westwards is the Cristal Hotel, the first real post-war hotel in Bialystok in Poland, and located the intersection with Liniarskiego and Malmeda streets.

On the other side of Liniarskiego Street stands the Orthodox Cathedral of St. Nicholas, built in 1843–1846. It is a classicist building, built on the plan of a Greek cross.

At Lipowa 14, is the building where the first self-service store in Poland was built, the "Pokój" cinema, and on the opposite side of the street the Art Nouveau palace of Chaim Nowik, which now houses the Military Command of Supplements (next to which were the barracks of the 8th horse artillery battery in the quarter between today's Lipowa, Dabrowskiego, Poleska, and Przejazd streets).
