= Jakub Kostiuczuk =

Polish archbishop

Jakub (Kostiuczuk)
- Archbishop of Białystok and Gdańsk
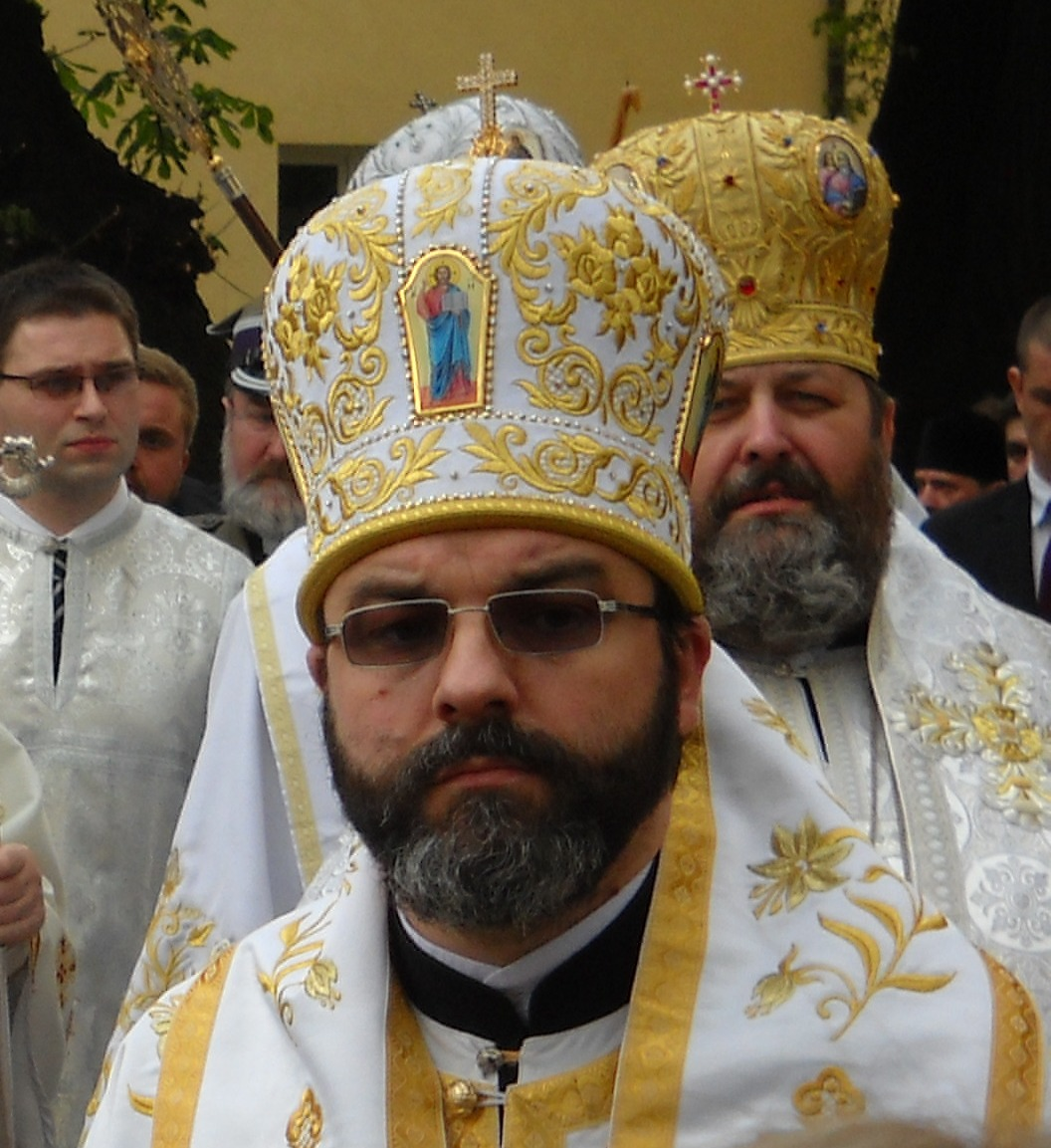
- Church: Polish Orthodox Church
- Elected: 1999
- Predecessor: Sawa (Hrycuniak)

Orders
- Ordination: 1993
- Consecration: 1998

Personal details
- Born: October 22, 1966 Narew

Archbishop Jakub, (secular birth name Jakub Kostiuczuk; born 22 October 1966 in Narew) is the Archbishop of Białystok and Gdańsk.

== Biography ==
He graduated from the Electrical Technical School in Białystok, where he later worked as an electrician. In 1987 he entered the Supraśl monastery, received a monastic haircut and was ordained deacon. In the same year, he began studies at the Moscow Theological Academy, where in 1992 he defended his master's thesis. He was ordained a priest in 1989 by the then archbishop of Białystok and Gdańsk, Sawa, and he made his monastic vows in 1993. In 1995 he started working at the Christian Theological Academy in Warsaw as an assistant at the Department of Dogmatic and Moral Theology. From that year he also served as the spiritual protector of the Orthodox Society of Saints Cyril and Methodius. Later appointed governor of the Monastery of the Annunciation of the Most Holy Mother of God and St. John the Theologian in Supraśl.

He was ordained bishop on 11 May 1998 with the title of bishop of Supraśl. Since August 1998, he has been the spiritual guardian of the Brotherhood of Orthodox Youth. By the decision of the Holy Council of Bishops, on 30 March 1999, he was appointed the Ordinary of the Białystok-Gdańsk diocese. The ceremonial ingress of the Białystok cathedral took place on 22 May 1999. On 16 June 2008, he received the dignity of the archbishop.

On 27 June 2011, at the Christian Theological Academy in Warsaw, he defended his doctoral dissertation on "Christological dogma in the liturgical texts of St. John of Damascus".

In 2016, he became a member of the delegation of the Polish Autocephalous Orthodox Church to the Holy and Great Council of the Orthodox Church.

On 30 May 2019, he became a member of the Council of the Christian Academy of Theology in Warsaw.

On 1 July 2019, he became a professor at the Christian Theological Academy in Warsaw.

Eastern Orthodox Church titles
Preceded by Sawa (Hrycuniak)	Bishop of Białystok and Gdańsk; 1998–2008	Vacant
New title	Archbishop of Białystok and Gdańsk; 2008–present	Incumbent
