= Orthodox Cathedral of St. Nicholas, Białystok =

Orthodox Cathedral of St. Nicholas in Białystok
- Sobór św. Mikołaja Cudotwórcy
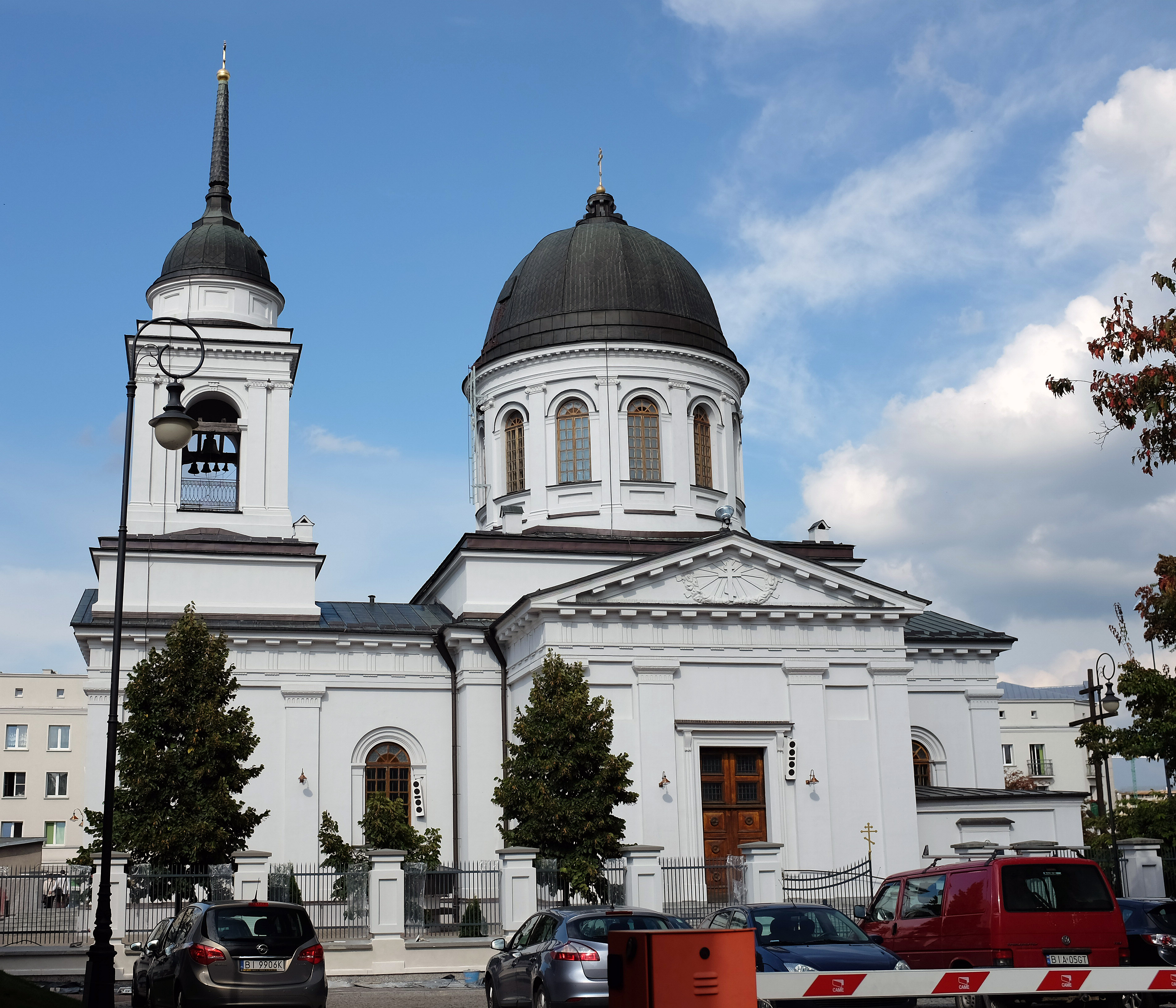
- Orthodox Cathedral of St. Nicholas in Białystok
- 53°07′57.87″N 23°09′16.37″E
- Location: 5 Lipowa Street, Centrum District, Białystok
- Country: Poland
- Denomination: Eastern Orthodox
- Website: soborbialystok.pl

Architecture
- Style: Russian Revival

The Orthodox Cathedral of St. Nicholas in Białystok (Polish: Sobór św. Mikołaja Cudotwórcy; Russian: Николаевский собор) is an historic Orthodox cathedral in Bialystok, Poland

St. Nicholas is the cathedral of the Bialystok-Gdańsk diocese of the Polish Autocephalous Orthodox Church and the seat of the Bialystok parish of St. Mikołaj (in the deanery of Białystok). It is the largest Orthodox cathedral in the city.

The current St. Nicholas building was erected between 1843 and 1846 on the site of an Uniate church from the early 18th century. St. Nicholas was consecrated as a church by the Vilnius and Lithuanian metropolitan Józef. During the interwar period, St Nicholas was one of two Orthodox churches in Bialystok.

In 1951, St. Nicholas became the cathedral of the Białystok-Gdańsk diocese. Since 1992, the cathedral has been the resting place of the relics of Gabriel of Białystok.

The cathedral building represents the classical style, typical of the church architecture of the Russian Empire in the late 18th century and the early 19th century.

The cathedral is located in the center of Białystok at Lipowa Street 5. It entered in the register of monuments on January 24, 1957, under the number A-200.

== History ==
=== The first church of St. Nicholas ===
The first church of St. Nicholas in Bialystok, located near today's cathedral, was a branch of the Orthodox temple in Dojlidy.

According to some sources, St. Nicholas already existed in the 16th century. According to others, the marriage of Jan Klemens and Katarzyna Barbara Branicki founded the Uniate church of St. Nicholas before 1727 - this year comes a document in which Branicki offered 25 zlotys for her pastor for the deceased from his family. This is the oldest mention of the functioning of the temple of this rite. Probably, however, the foundation of the Uniate church took place at the end of the 17th century, in the years 1694–1696. Funding it, Stefan Mikołaj Branicki built a church for new residents arriving in the city. Such a hypothesis, presented by Przemysław Czyżewski, is evidenced by the inscription on the church antimine, which was signed by bishop Leon Załęski in 1708.

The old St. Nicholas church building was located at Choroska Street, at the Choroska Gate. It was wooden, painted yellow and gray, and had red domes. From 1748 comes the first information about the vicar parish in Dojlidy, whose duty was to service the church of St. Nicholas. In 1773 the building was described as follows: "wooden, plastered with lime, roofed tiles, with three domes, with iron crosses, gold-plated knobs".

In the same description, which is part of the inspection protocol of the Dojlidy parish, it was written that St. Nicholas had three altars: the main one with the image of the Blessed Virgin Mary with two silver crowns and two side ones, dedicated respectively to Christ the Savior ("Spasytel") and Saint Nicholas. Architecturally, the church was very similar to the Roman Catholic churches built at the same time: it had a square vestibule on the west side, a rectangular nave and a narrower presbytery. It was 14.2 meters long and 6.2 meters wide.

=== Under the Russian partition ===
A new St. Nicholas church was built due to the rising population of Białystok as a result of the development of local industry. Another factor was the increase in the number of Orthodox Christians, resulting from the liquidation of the Uniate Church in the Russian Empire and the influx of Russian officials.

In October 1838, the design of the St. Nicholas church was entrusted to the architect, Mikhailov, but there is no clear evidence that he is the author of the building plan. In 1840, a new church design was approved. On March 21, 1843, the superior of the new church was dedicated by the superior of the Supraśl Orthodox Monastery, Archimandrite Nikodem.

Between 1843 and 1846, the new St. Nicholas was erected next to the old church, which was demolished. The cemetery, which originally surrounded St. Nicholas, and the preserved tombstones were moved to the hill with the chapel of St. Mary Magdalene. The total cost of construction was over 36 thousand silver rubles, of which less than 3 thousand transferred the state treasury. St. Nicholas became the seat of the Orthodox parish, taking over the functions of the chapel of St. Alexander Nevsky in the Branicki Palace.

The new St. Nicholas church was built in the classical style, with elements referring to the architecture of antique, as well as to Byzantine cross-dome temples. Dawid Zabłudowski managed the construction works. In 1846, St. Nicholas was commissioned and blessed by the Vilnius and Lithuanian metropolitan Józeft.

St. Nicholas became the second church of the Vilnius and Lithuanian eparchy, in the rank of council. By 1850, the church had obtained a set of necessary equipment. According to the equipment list from 1859, five bells were located on its belfry, while the Bialystok Icon of the Mother of God was the object of worship of both the Orthodox and Catholic people. The first renovation of St. Nicholas took place between 1868 and 1872. Twelve years later, donors funded the insertion of the icon of St. Alexander Nevsky at the church, meant to commemorate the coronation of Tsar Alexander III and his wife Maria Feodororny. On August 25, 1897, St. Nicholas was visited by Tsar Nicholas II and his wife Alexandra Fyodorovna. In memory of their visit, the council received gifts from private donors for the purchase of a silver Gospel.

The interior of the St. Nicholas was decorated with frescoes, but the first composition, made during the years of construction, was destroyed before 1910. That same year, a group of Russian painters, under the leadership of Mikhail Avivov, created a new decoration, modeled in their work on the frescoes of Viktor Vasnetsov from the Cathedral of St. Włodzimierz in Kiev. In 1910, the church roof was renovated.

In 1900, due to the change of administrative borders of the eparchy, St. Nicholas was transferred to the Grodno eparchy. Again, it became the second church of the eparchy . On October 24, 1910, after renovation, St. Nicholas was consecrated again by Bishop of Grodno and Brest Michał.

=== In independent Poland ===
After the restoration of Polish independence in 1918, the new government viewed the Orthodox religious buildings in Bialystok as symbols of the previous Russification policy and revised them for the Catholic Church.

On July 11, 1936, the Pochaiv Icon of the Mother of God was brought to Bialystok. A service held in St. Nicholas drew 1,500 people. In 1938, the church celebrated the 950th anniversary of the baptism of Rus.

Until 1951, St. Nicholas was an ordinary parish church. On September 7, 1951, the Council of Bishops of the Polish Autocephalous Orthodox Church founded the diocese of Białystok-Gdańsk and designated St. Nicholas as its cathedral. Between 1955 and 1958, the cathedral building was renovated and modernized. At that time, the outer walls and the presbytery were renovated, and the church of St. Serafina from Sarów.

In the first years after World War II, the Polish Ministry of Public Security conducted surveillance of the clergy serving at St. Nicholas as part of the object case codenamed Mikołaj.

From 1975 to 1976, the inner walls of St. Nicholas were renovated. At that time, it was determined that Avivov's frescoes could not be preserved. The Council decided to replace them with a new painting decoration. Only the presbytery fresco of Avivov with the figure of the Risen Christ was preserved. The painter of the new works was Józef Latviaowski.

In 1987, St. Nicholas was visited by Constantinople Patriarch Dmitri. In 1988, the millennium anniversary of the baptism of Rus was celebrated under Basil, the metropolitan of Warsaw and all of Poland. In June 1991, Pope John Paul II visited St. Nicholas.

Between 1988 and 1990, St. Nicholas was renovated again. The exterior plasters of the building were replaced, the kiots and the iconostasis were renovated and gilded, and the roof and domes were covered with copper sheet. From 1991 to 1995, work was carried out on developing the immediate surroundings of St. Nicholas.

On September 21–22, 1992, the relics of Gabriel of Białystok, previously kept in Grodno, were transferred to the Polish Autocephalous Orthodox Church by Bishop Grodno and Wołkowyski Walenty. The procession from the city limits to St. Nicholas was observed by over 70,000 spectators, including nine Orthodox bishops, from the Polish Autocephalous Orthodox Church and the Belarusian Exarchate, as well as the Roman Catholic Archbishop of Bialystok Edward Kisiel and the Voivode of Białystok Voivodeship, Stanisław Prutis.

In June 2010, St. Nicholas was visited by the Patriarch of Jerusalem, Theophilos III. On August 18, 2012 - head of the Russian Orthodox Church, Patriarch of Moscow and all Russia, Cyril I, August 21, 2016 - Patriarch of Antioch, Jan X, in August 2018 - the metropolitan of America and Canada, Tikhon Mollard, head of the Orthodox Church of America, and September 21–22 of the same year, Alexandrian Patriarch Theodor II.

Behind the church building, there was a former catechism house (had the number 15b Lipowa, later 4 Sw. Mikolaja street), which housed Public General School for Boys no. 9 in the years 1920-1939. The building was built around 1803 and was demolished in 2021.

== See also ==
- Orthodox Cathedral of St. Nicholas in Kuopio
- Eastern Orthodox Church
