= Sienkiewicza Street, Białystok =

Street in Białystok, Poland

Sienkiewicza Street
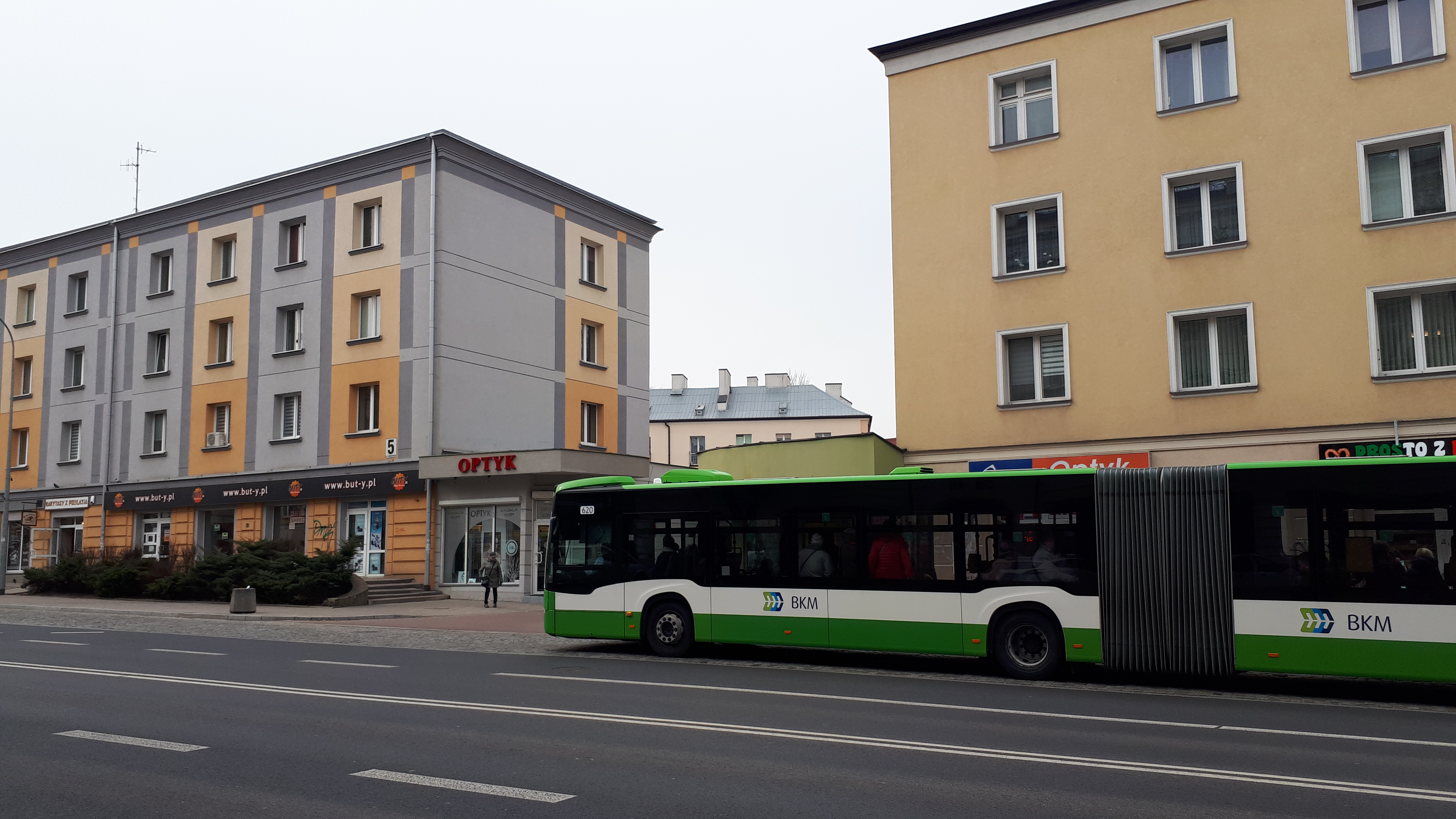
- Native name: Ulica Sienkiewicza (Polish)
- Former name(s): Mikolajewska, 1st May
- Type: Street
- Length: 1,725 m (5,659 ft)
- Location: Centrum, Sienkiewicza and Bojary districts, Białystok
- Coordinates: 53°08′15″N 23°10′05″E

Sienkiewicza Street (Polish: Ulica Sienkiewicza) is a major street and a thoroughfare in Białystok running from the Kościuszko Market Square towards the Poleski Railway Station, running through Centrum, Sienkiewicza and Bojary districts.

== History ==
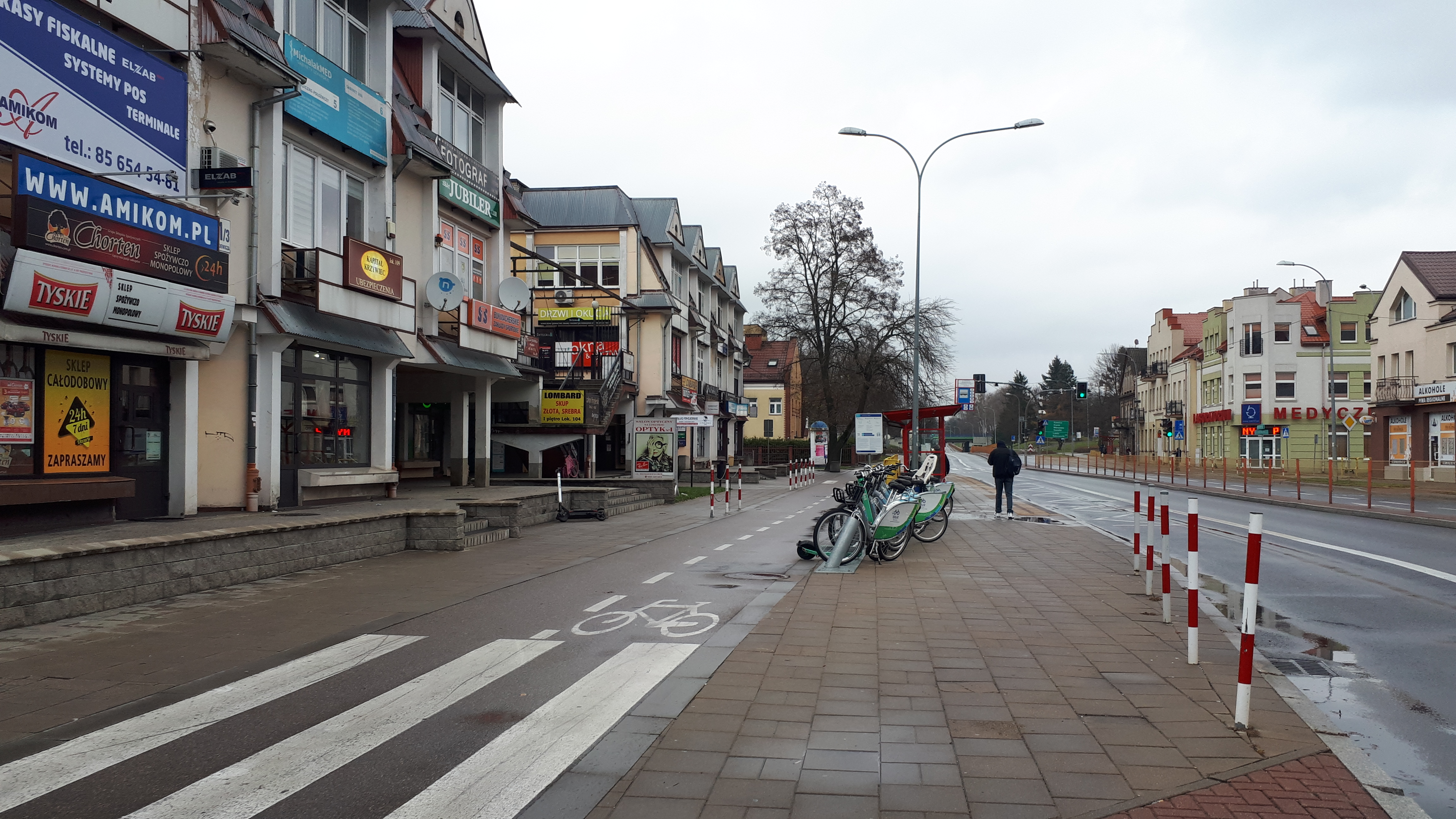
View of the street, November 2021

The street began as a road leading to Wasilków and Grodno. It was not until the mid-18th century that it was given an urban character. It was then called Wasilkowska. It ended at the Wasilków Gate, situated just beyond the Biała river. Near the gate, at the current intersection of Sienkiewicza and Piłsudskiego Avenue, stood the impressive "Pod Jeleniem" inn. In turn, the corner buildings at the entrance to the market square were the manor house (currently Astoria) and the "Pod Łosiem" tenement house in the opposite side.

At the beginning of the 19th century, the appearance of the street did not change much. It was characteristic that on the side starting from the former manor house, in 1810 belonging to Chaim Zabludowski, almost exclusively Christians lived. On the opposite side of the street, Jews predominated among the owners of the houses. The owner of the former "Pod Losiem" tenement house was also Zabludowski. At the end of the 19th century, it housed the Citizens' Club. In the second half of the 19th century, the name of the street was changed from Wasilkowska to Mikołajewska, commemorating Tsar Nicholas I. From that time on, a large construction movement began in this part of the city. New houses were built, in which more and more shops and service establishments were established. In 1862, just behind the bridge, the Pulkov Synagogue was built. In 1863, between Jurowiecka, Sienkiwicza and Ogrodowa streets, the Trylling Factory was built. In 1884, in the vicinity of Mikolajewska Street, at today's Traugutta Street, large barracks of the 64th Kazan Infantry Regiment were built.

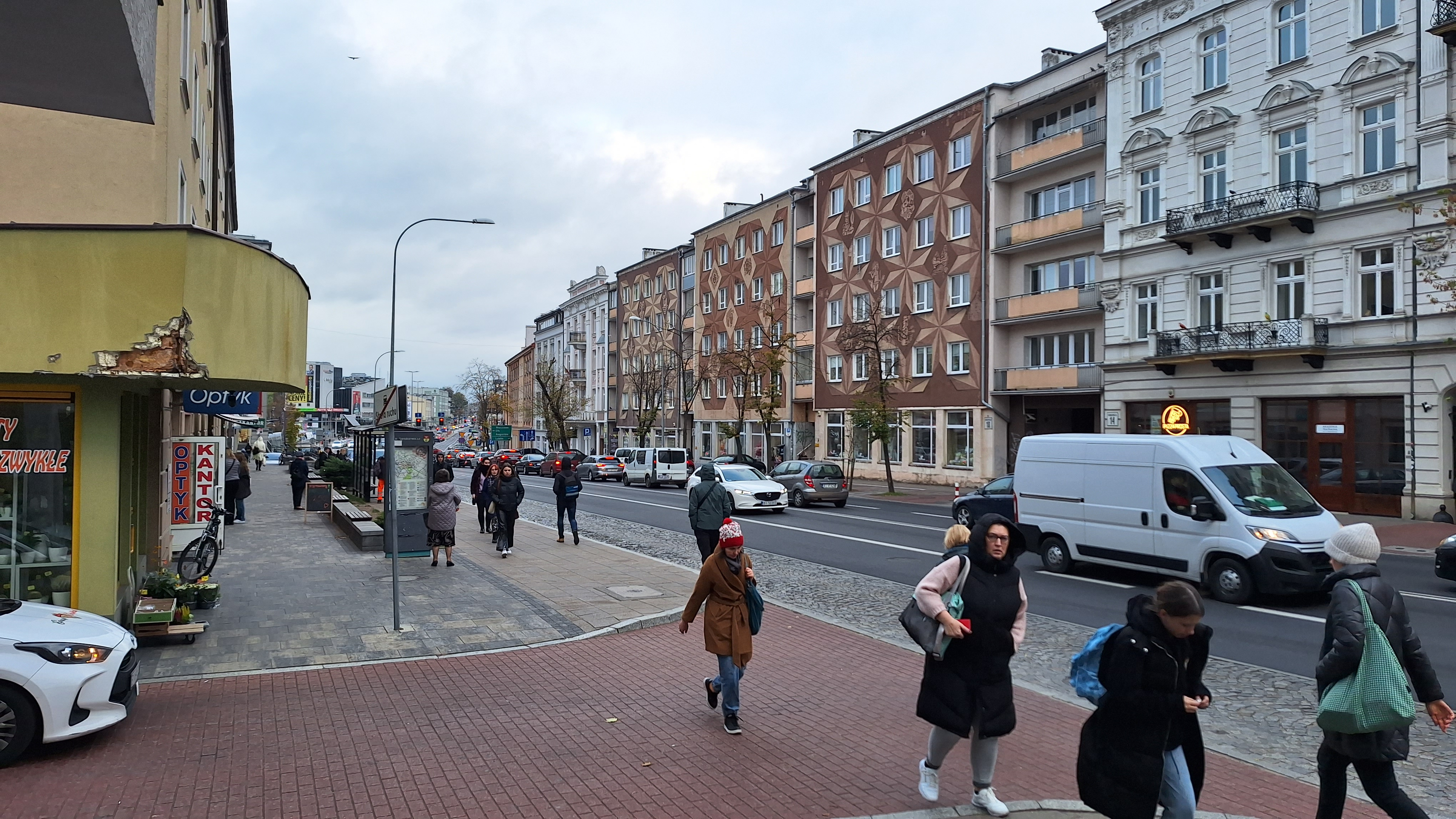
View of the street, October 2023

In 1886, the Białystok-Volkovysk-Baranowicze railway line was built, enabling communication with Moscow. The tracks of this railway crossed Mikolajewska Street, and the Poleski quarter was built near the barracks. The aforementioned construction activity prompted the city authorities to implement a project to modernize the street. In the last years of the 19th century, it was widened on the section from Warszawska Street to the tracks of the Poleski railway station. In the middle of the street there was a walking alley planted with espaliered trees and separated from the roadway by wooden barriers. On both sides of the alley there were paved roads. It was a favorite place for walks for the people of Białystok. The remains of the boulevards were not eliminated until 1965. Before 1915, Mikołajewska Street was particularly popular with bankers: out of nine bank exchange offices operating in the city, seven were located here. During World War I, after the Germans occupied the city in August 1915, they only changed the spelling of the street's name. From Mikołajewska it became Nikolai Strasse. In 1916 it was named after Henryk Sienkiewicz.

In the interwar period, the street retained its commercial character, although schools and offices appeared on it. In 1919, the Sholem Aleichem Library was opened at the Regimental Synagogue at Sienkiewicza 36. It soon gained fame as one of the most important libraries in Białystok. In 1922, in the former "Grand Hotel", at no. 4 (right behind the "Astoria" restaurant), the Zeligman, Lebenhaft and Dereczynski Coeducational Gymnasium began its activity. In 1926, opposite the gymnasium, the Jewish miniature theatre "Gilarino" was established, run by W. Bubryk and the painter Oskar Rozanecki. In this period the popular "Cafe Lux" was at Sienkiwicza street at no. 38. In 1927, at the end of the street, right by the market square, a triumphal arch was erected, where the Archbishop of Vilnius, Romuald Jalbrzykowski, was welcomed - when he came to inspect the construction of the St. Roch's Church. In 1930, the Office of the District Governor opened its seat at no. 27. Following the outbreak of World War II and the German occupation of Poland the Gestapo took up residence in the former building of the District Office. In 1944, almost all of the buildings were destroyed.

During the reconstruction of the city center in the years 1945–1958, the streets were extended, connecting it with Legionowa Street and so eased the transportation issues.
