= Białystok brick architecture =

Architecture style originated in Białystok, Poland

Białystok brick architecture or Białystok school of construction (Polish: Białostocka szkoła muratorska), also known as Białystok school of bricklaying, is an architectural style that existed mainly in the 19th and early 20th century and originated in the city of Bialystok in north-east Poland.

== Overview ==
With the industrialization in Białystok began in the mid-19th century, that followed the abolition of the customs zone between Congress Poland and the Russian Empire in 1851, textile factories, established by industrialists from Łódź were set up in city and its surrounding areas. The architecture of military and factory buildings from this period was marked by simplicity and austerity, reflecting the strength, discipline, and technical precision of modern industry and military structures. These buildings were primarily constructed using industrially produced red or yellow bricks—materials brought into the region along with architectural forms from outside Białystok. These structures were defined by a characteristic monochromatic colour scheme. While the construction method differed from traditional plastered buildings, it required a comparable level of craftsmanship in bricklaying. Similar architectural elements were used to shape the facades, including plinths, pilasters, cornices, eaves, and window and door frames.

Eliminating the need for plastering, stucco, and painting not only reduced costs but also increased facade durability, minimizing future maintenance. After a period of adjustment, even modest investors began adopting this approach for residential homes and smaller public buildings. As the style evolved, buildings became more architecturally diverse, with greater detail and complexity. Efforts were also made to break the monotony of single-colour facades. Białystok builders began using both red and yellow bricks together to enhance decorative appeal and move away from the stark, utilitarian look of factory or military structures.

Over time, this architectural style gained widespread acceptance and was used in increasingly prominent buildings—such as the fire station on Warszawska Street, tenement houses on Kościuszko Market Square and the main post office on Kościelna Street. Notably, even industrial and military architecture began to incorporate the new aesthetic.

By the end of the 19th century, brick buildings with red and yellow facades spanned nearly every function—ranging from small homes and villas to public buildings, factories, barracks, and churches—each developing its own variations. This architectural period came to an end with the outbreak of World War II. After the war, and with the establishment of the Polish People's Republic, architectural priorities shifted sharply toward Socialist Realism and large-panel construction.

Following the end Communism in Poland in the early 1990s, the new political and economic climate encouraged architects to move away from the monotony of prefabricated panel buildings. Traditional brick regained popularity, and various construction projects in the city began incorporating design elements that had reference to the historic red and yellow brick motifs.

== Examples ==
=== Classical ===
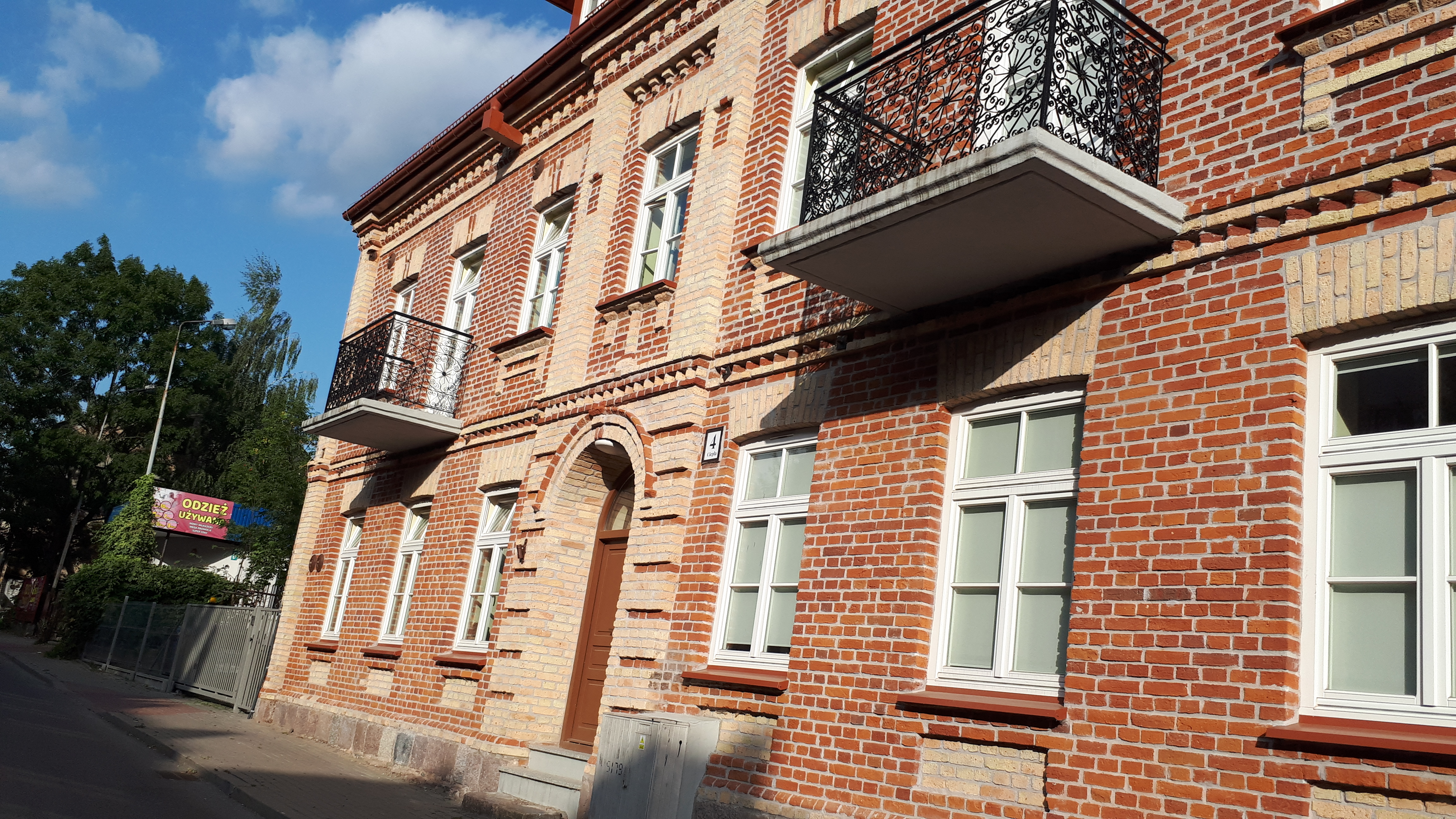
4 Ciepła

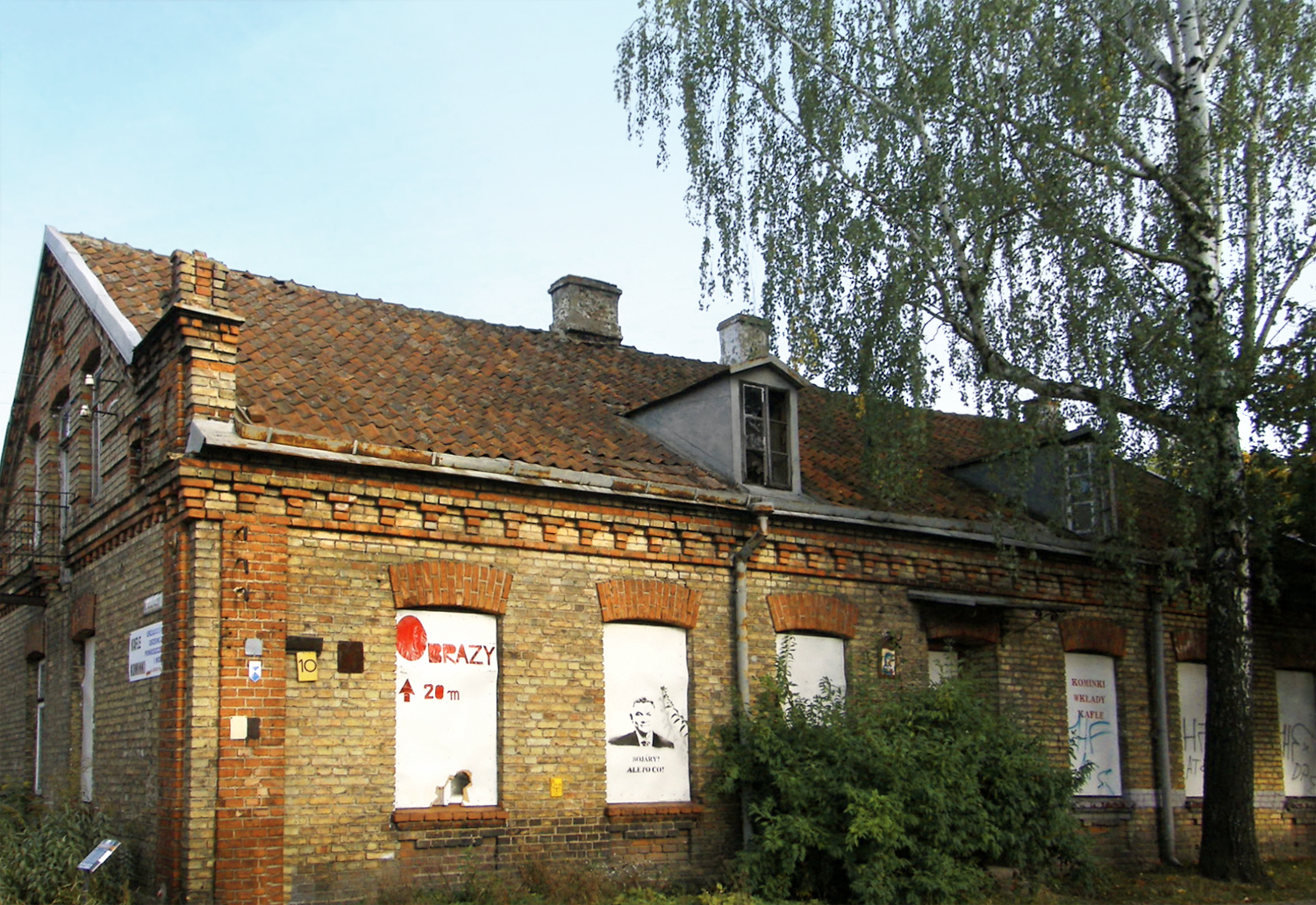
10 Staszica

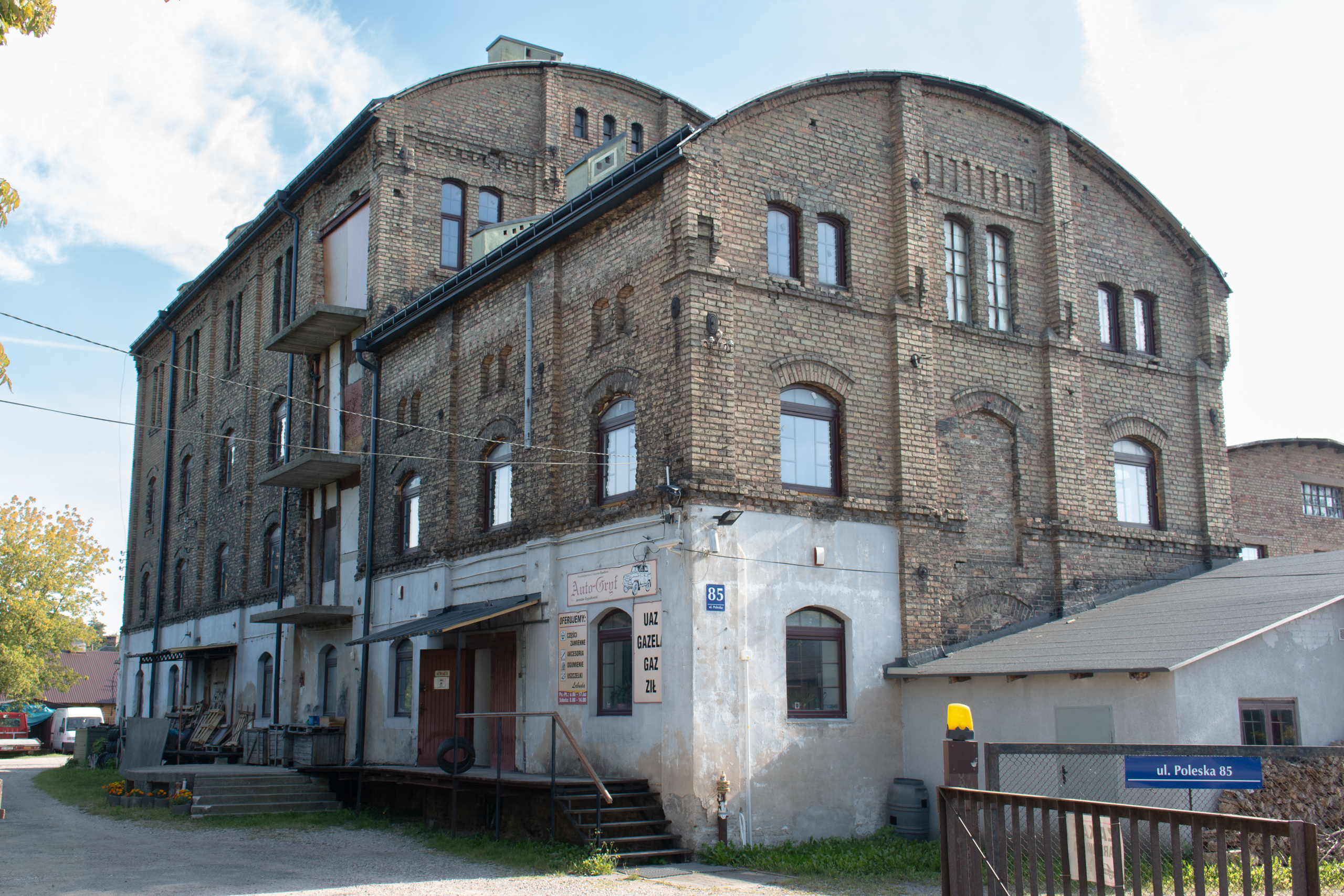
85 Poleska

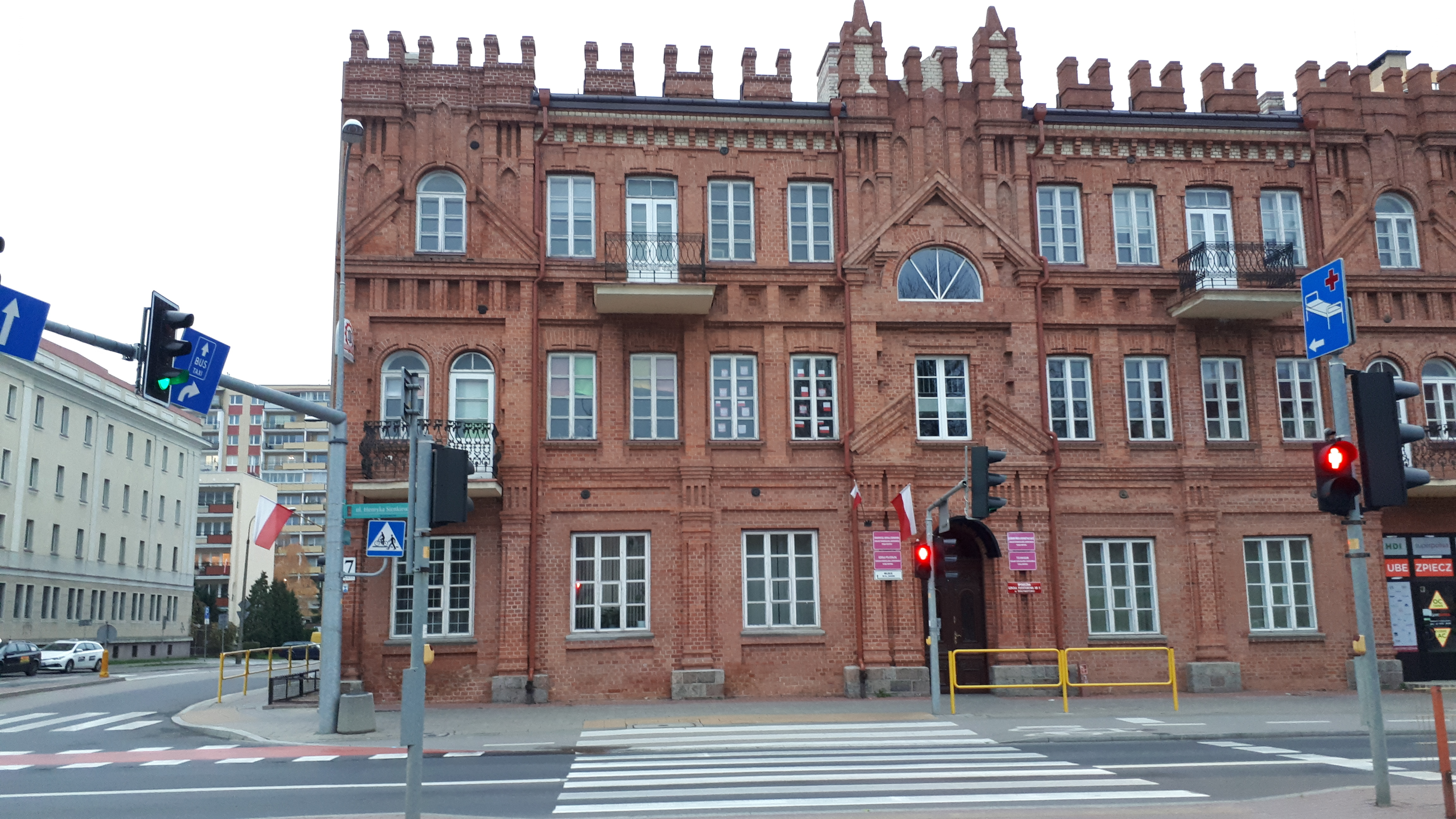
77 Sienkiewicza

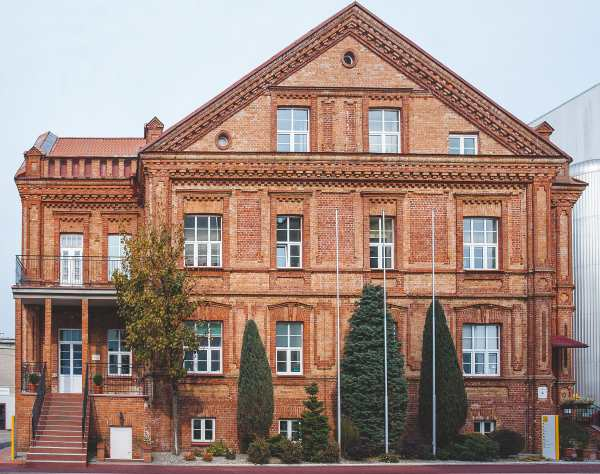
Dojlidy brewery

=== Modern variation ===
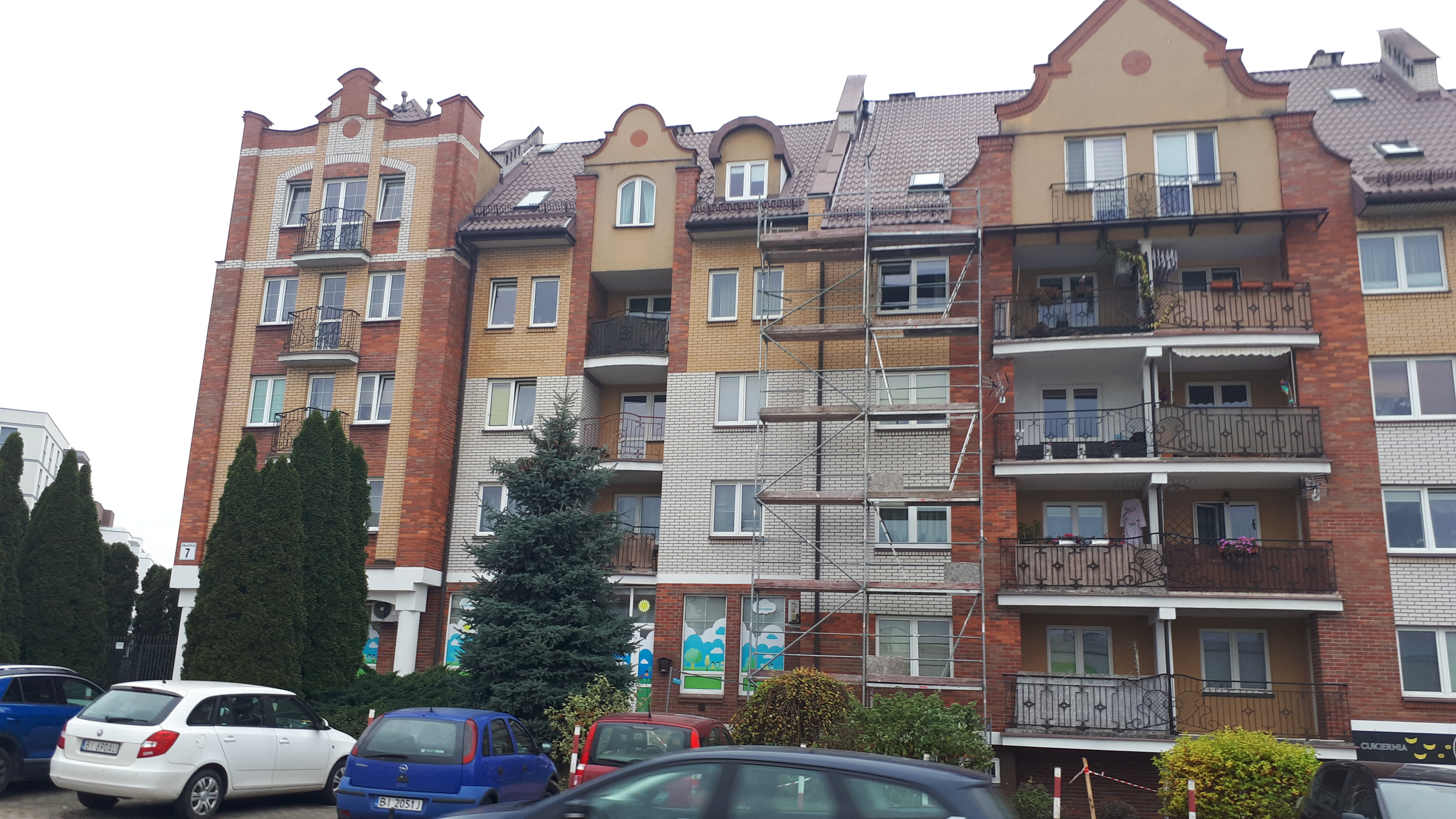
7 Kołłątaja

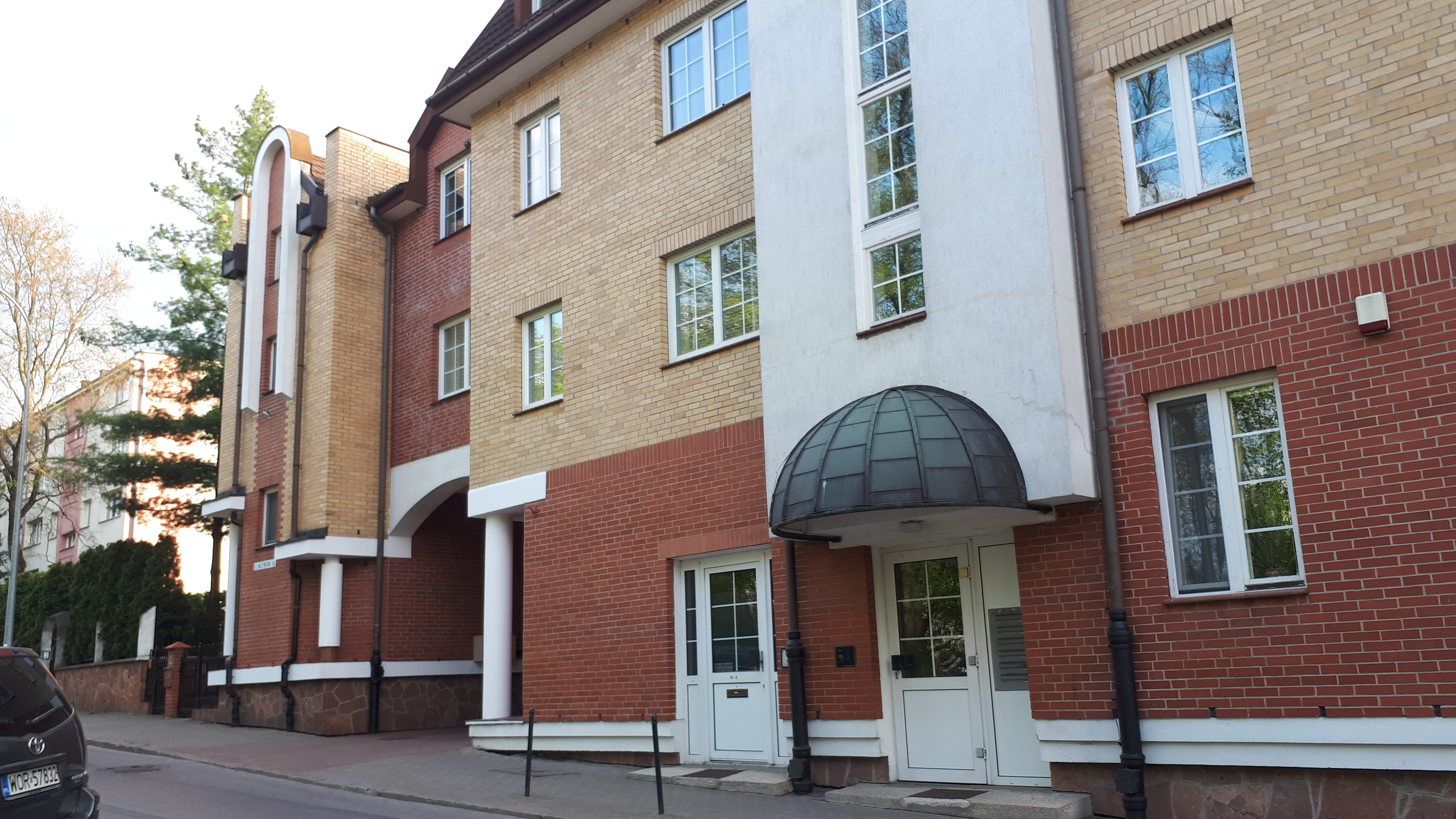
Building in Waszyngtona street

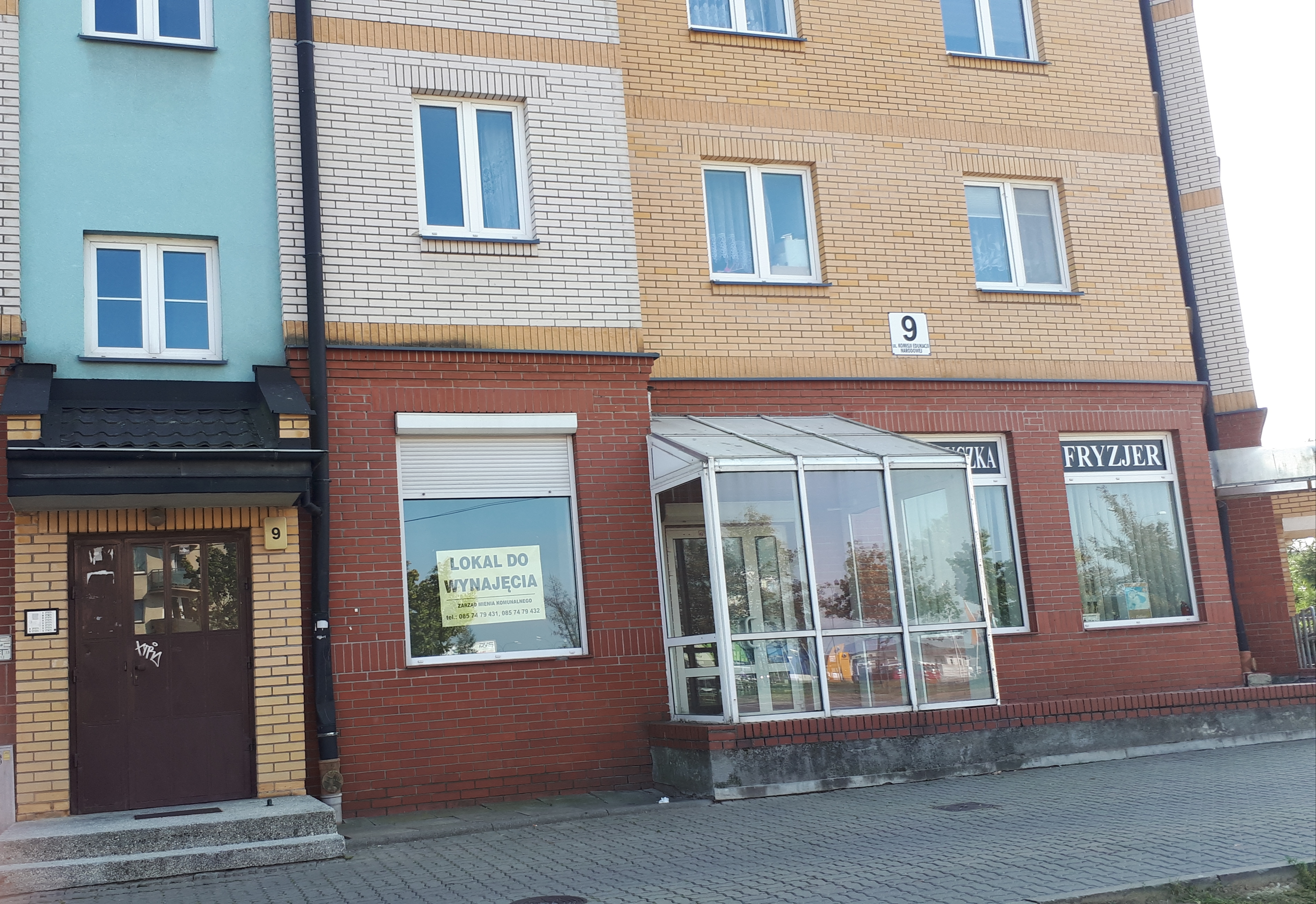
Building in Komisji Edukacji Narodowej street

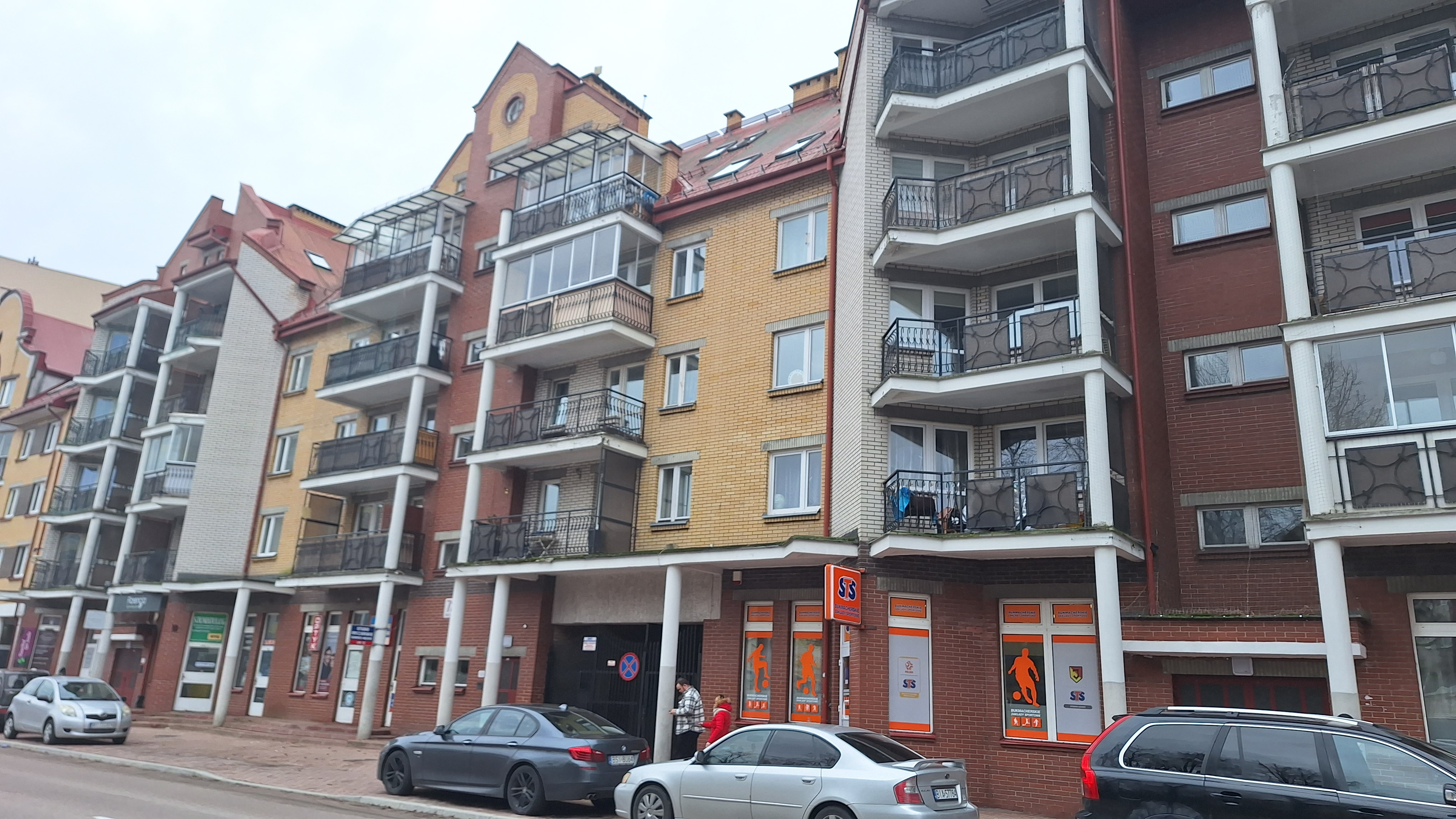
Building in Warszawska Street

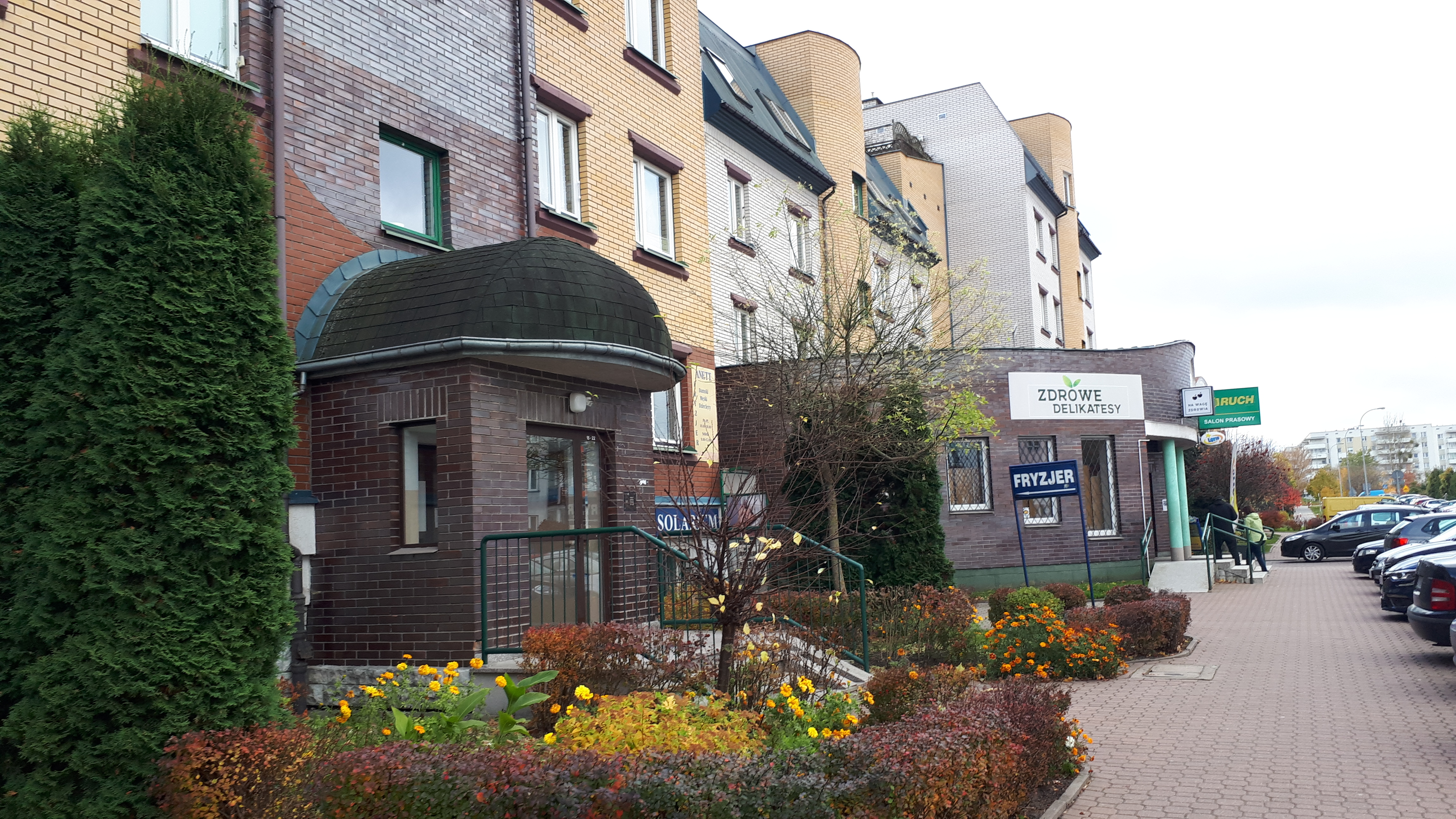
Buildings in Zachodnia street

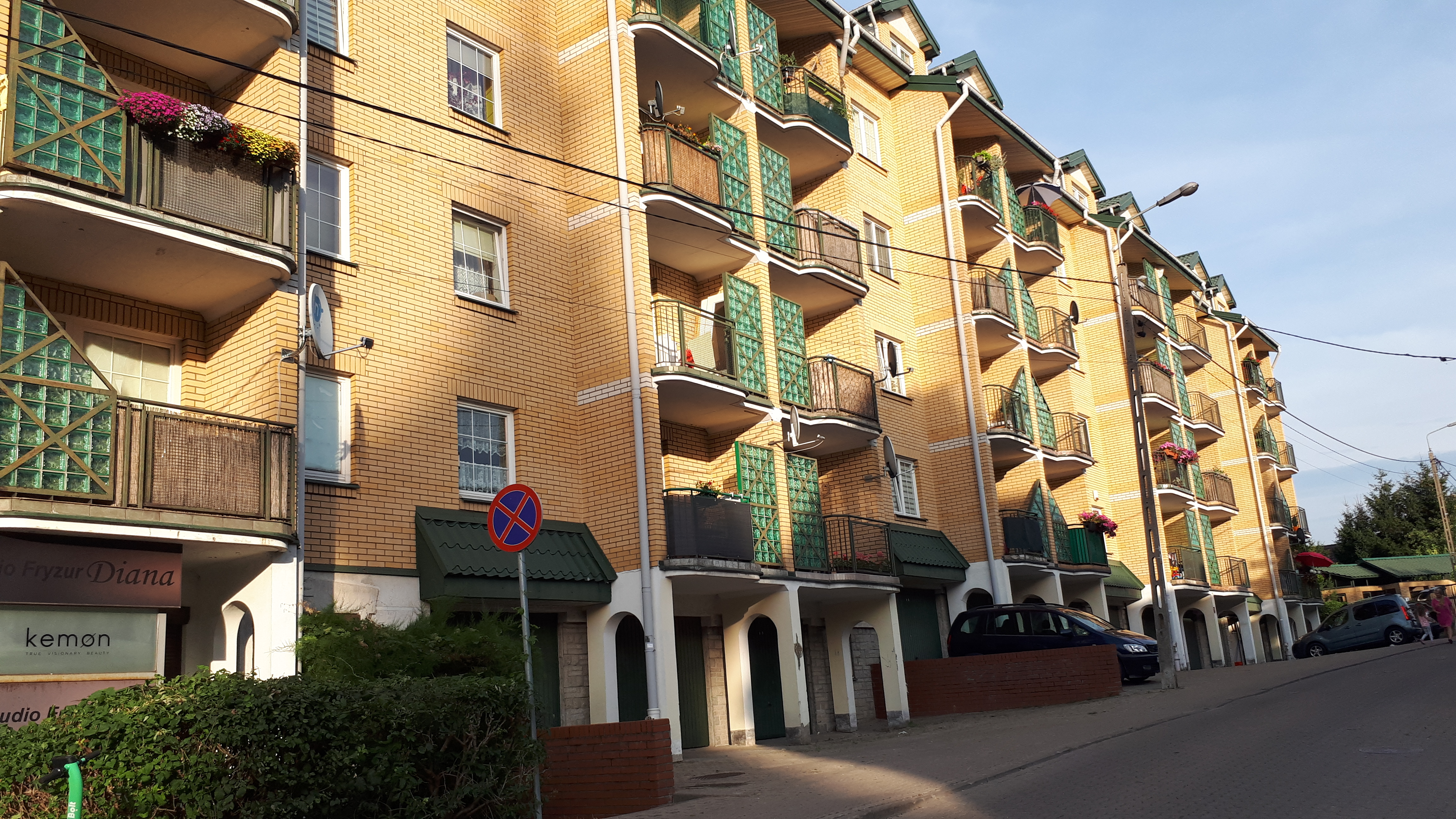
Building in Kamienna Street

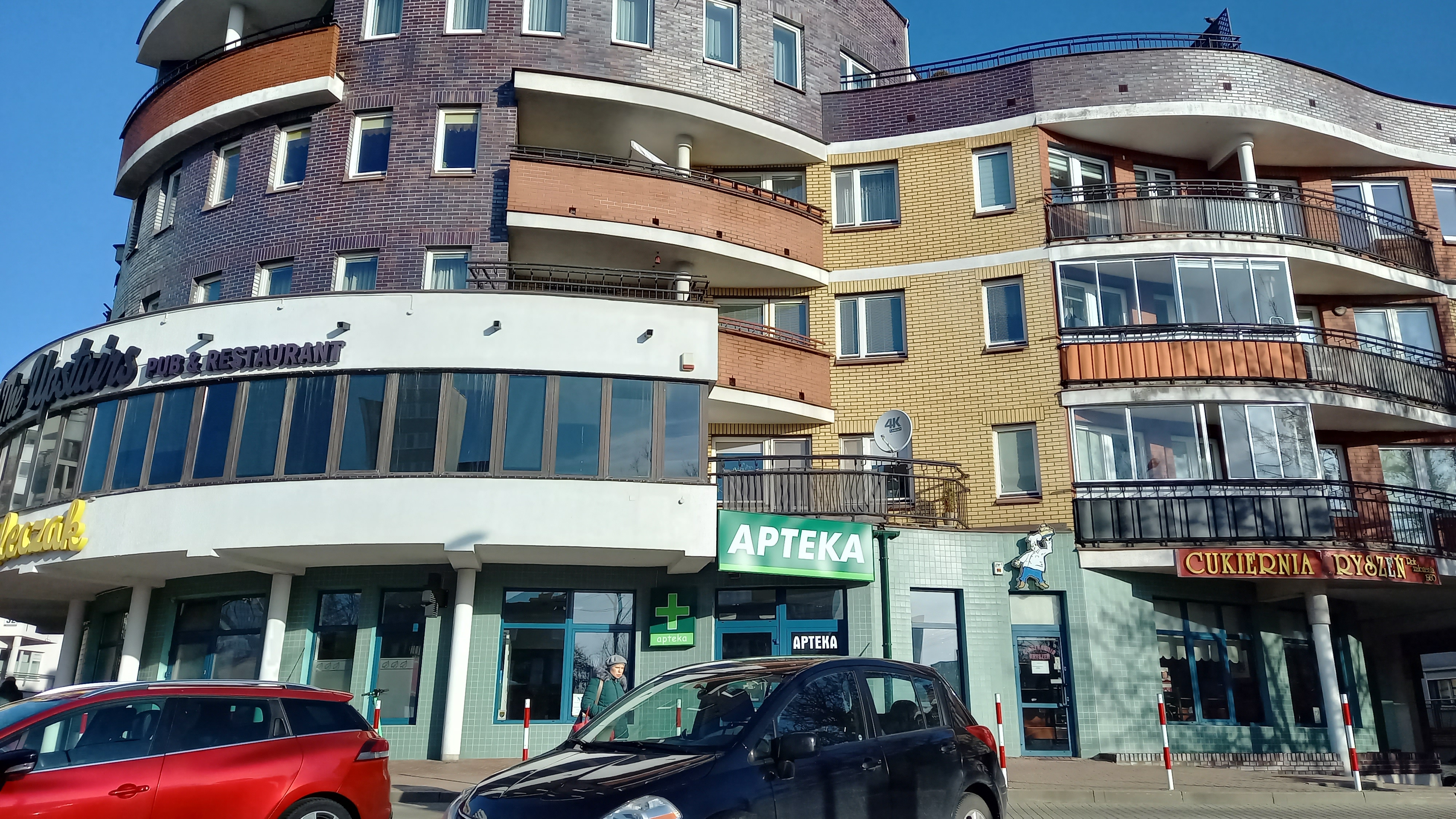
Building in Żelazna Street
