= Warszawska Street =

Street in Białystok, Poland

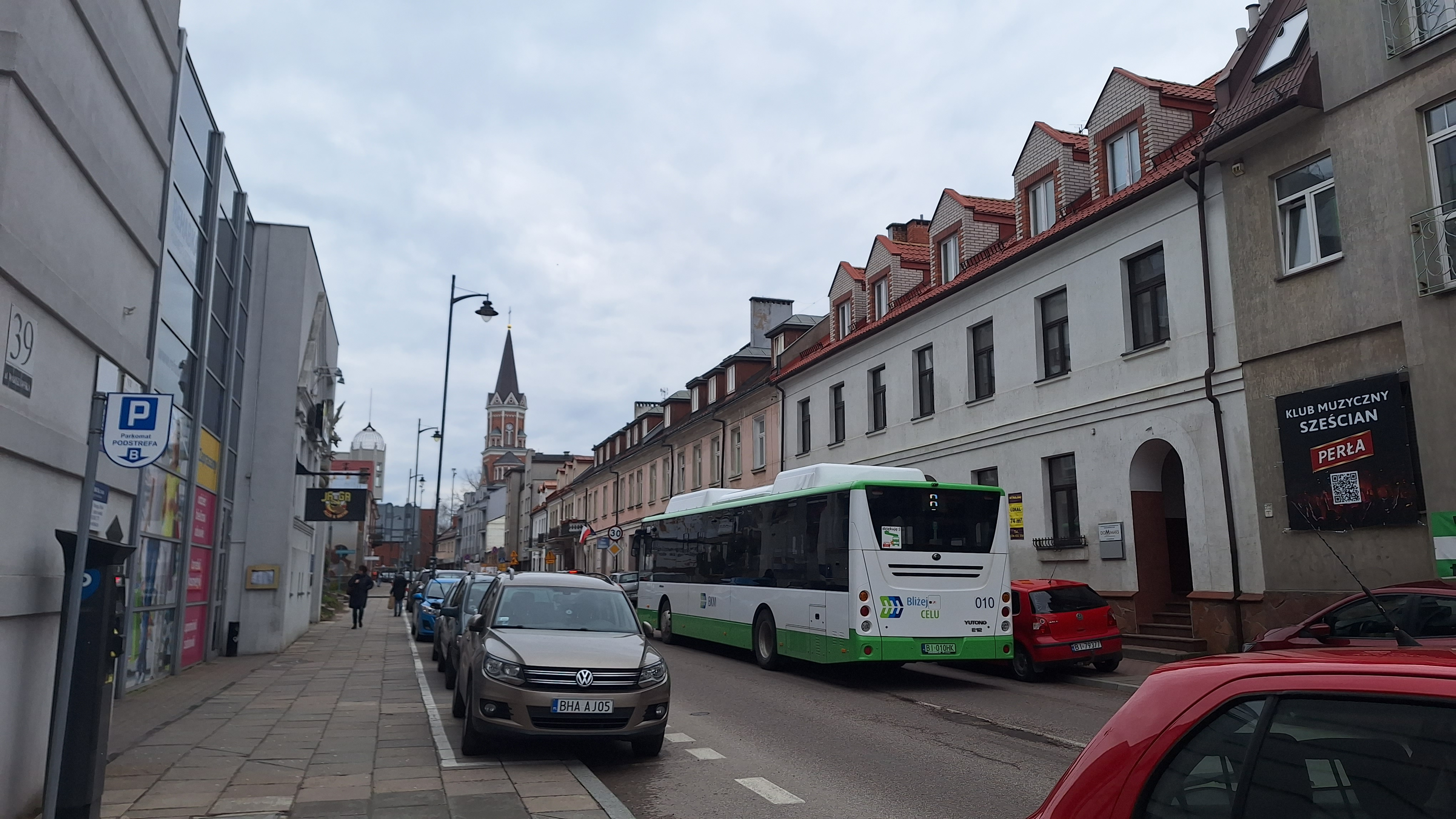
- Interactive map of Warszawska Street
- Native name: Ulica Warszawska (Polish)
- Former name(s): Aleksandrowska, Pierackiego
- Type: Street
- Length: 1,610 m (5,280 ft)
- Location: Bojary and Piasta II districts of Białystok
- Coordinates: 53°07′51″N 23°10′24″E

Warszawska Street (Polish: Ulica Warszawska) is a street in the Bojary and Piasta II districts of Białystok, stretching from Sienkiewicza street to Piastowska street. The street name refers to the name of the capital city of Warsaw.

== History ==
Around the Branicki Palace and the town's market square, suburbs began to grow chaotically, including Bojary. The residents of the new districts, poor immigrants from the countryside, arrived with the entire baggage of rural traditions: the layout of houses, traditional behaviors and way of life. These people came from different regions, which resulted in a large variety of types of buildings being erected. By the mid 19th century this was the main street of the city, containing offices, tenement houses and shops. In 1910, Jews predominated among the owners of Warszawska Street. They constituted 46.2 percent of all owners, Poles made up 28.1 percent, Germans 12.4 percent and the Russians 3.3 percent.

In August 1920 the Battle of Białystok fierce street fight occurred in the street and its surroundings with Józef Marjański, one of the city defenders, killed in the intersection of Warszawska and Pałacowa streets.

During World War II, one of the aspects of German policy in occupied Poland was the liquidation of material cultural heritage. It did not include the 19th-century wooden districts, which is why the Boyars survived the German occupation. In addition, the vast damage caused by the suppression of the Białystok Ghetto uprising and during the occupation of the city by the Red Army from the Wehrmacht in July 1944 spared this part of the city. Following the war and the inclusion of the city in the Polish People's Republic, a number of old buildings were demolished in favor of modern construction.

== Buildings ==
There are many notable and historic buildings and structures on Warszawska Street, including:

- Warszawska 3 - Provincial Headquarters of the State Fire Service
- Warszawska 5a - Built in 1894, but the history of the property dates back to the early 19th century and the period of the Prussian partition.
- Warszawska 7 - Trylling Palace, dating back to 1871, alternating ownership with the Bulkowstein family and the Trylling family between the late 19th century and the early 20th century. It is currently a property of the national treasury.
- Warszawska 7a - Old manor house
- Warszawska 8 - VI High School – King Sigismund Augustus
- Warszawska 9 - Before 1858, the property belonged first to Krzysztof Sztulz, who built it between 1803 and 1807, and then, in the years around 1817–1829, to Dominik Ciecierski, the district marshal of the nobility.
- Warszawska 10 - main post office
- Warszawska 15 - Obstetrics and Gynecology Hospital
- Warszawska 19 - The Ludwik Zamenhof Centre
- Warszawska 27 - Szturmanów Tenement house
- Warszawska 29 - Podlaskie Regional Board of the Polish Red Cross
- Warszawska 30 - Listed building
- Warszawska 35 - Until 1945, it was the location of the city hall. Later, a shopping center was built.
- Warszawska 37 - Cytron Palace (currently the Historical Museum)
- Warszawska 39 - Former factory
- Warszawska 40 - Michał Malinowski's Tenement
- Warszawska 42 - Świński's Tenement house
- Warszawska 46 - Archdiocesan Higher Seminary
- Warszawska 46a - St. Wojciech's Church
- Warszawska 50 - Known as Vossa House or Berk Polak House. During the Nazi occupation of the city, housed the Gestapo. Today houses various offices including the Department of Catholic Theology at the University of Białystok
- Warszawska 57 - Abram Cytron's Tenement
- Warszawska 63 - Mr. Trębicki's Tenement, currently the seat of the Faculty of Economics and Management at the University of Białystok
- Warszawska 64 - Historic residential tenement built by the first director of the Białystok Power Plant
- Warszawska 65 - Historic buildings of the former State Vodka Factory (until 2023 it housed the 2nd Police Station in Białystok)
- Warszawska 68 - Prior to the construction of a contemporary apartment building, the house that existed in that address until 2020 was belonging to Hirsz Zbar.
