= Osiedle Skorupy, Białystok =

Skorupy
- District (osiedle) of Białystok
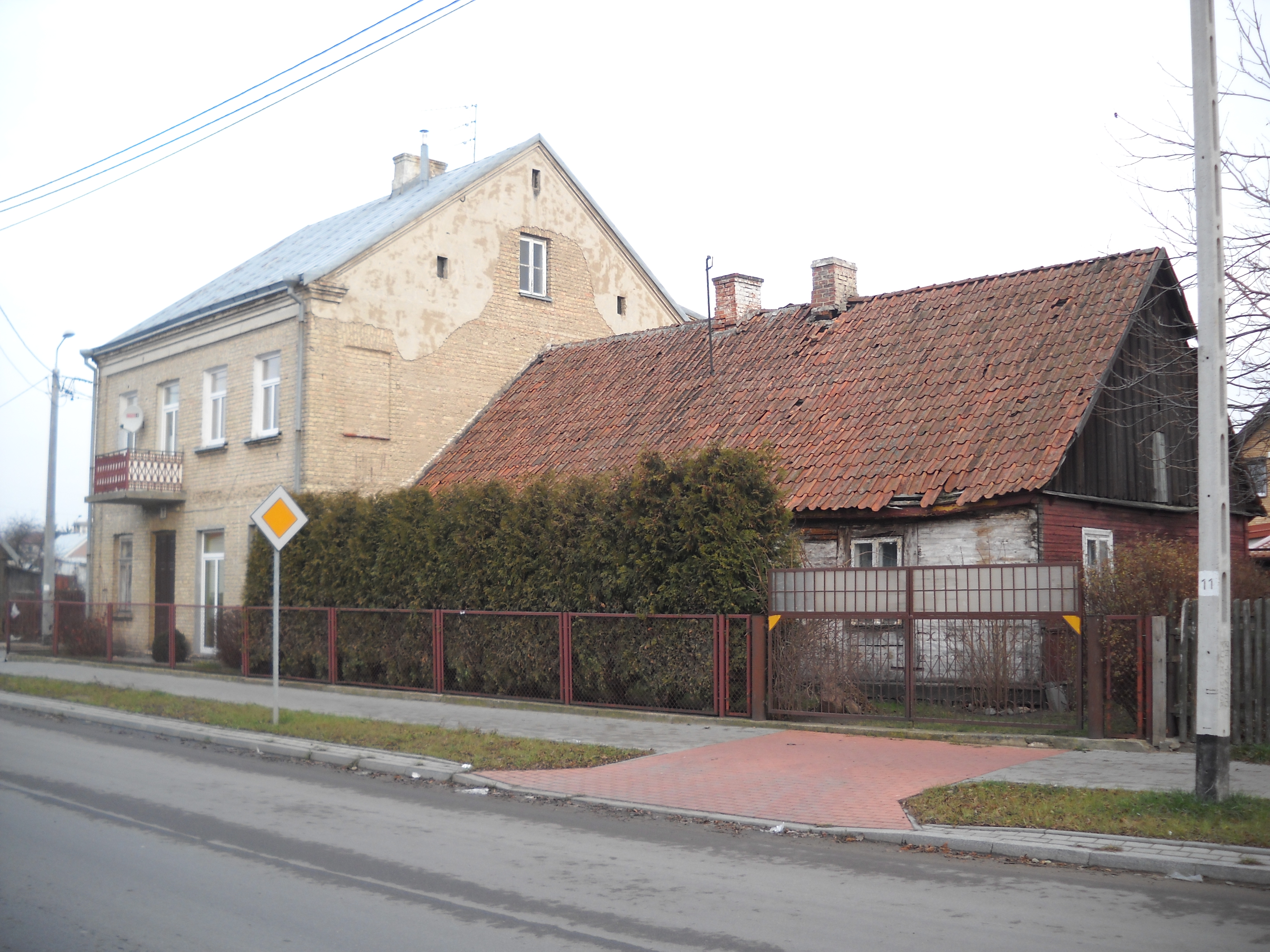
- Nowowarszawska 11 in the district

- Location of Skorupy within Białystok
- Coordinates: 53°07′24″N 23°12′29″E
- Country: Poland
- Voivodeship: Podlaskie
- City: Białystok

Area
  - Total: 4.333 km^{2} (1.673 sq mi)
- Time zone: UTC+1 (CET)
  - Summer (DST): UTC+2 (CEST)
- Area code: +48 85
- Vehicle registration: BI

Skorupy is one of the districts of the Polish city of Białystok, located in the eastern part of the city and contains industrial and residential buildings.

== History ==
In the 15th century, the area of the village of Skorupy belonged to the Białystok estate, which was received in the 30s of that century by a descendant of the boyars of Lithuania, Raczko Tabutowicz of Łabędź. The village of Skorupy was first recorded in 1633 during a visit to the Białystok Roman Catholic couple. All locations that were under the clerical authority of the presbytery in Bialystok were indicated. Were it not for sale in 1528 and inclusion within the boundaries of the Zabłudów estate, the Dojlidzkie estate with the village of Skorupa would remain in the Bielsko poviat of the Podlasie voivodeship and in 1569 it would pass along with the Białystok estate to the Polish Crown. However, after the Union of Lublin in 1569, the border between the Białystok and Zabłudów estates, which since 1513 was the border between the Podlasie and Trotsk provinces, became the border between the Polish Crown and the Grand Duchy of Lithuania. There was an administrative border, since from 1569 both countries were merged into a single union. Nevertheless, until 1795, the village of Skorupy was in the Grodno poviat of the Trotsky province of the Grand Duchy of Lithuania, while Białystok remained in the Bielsko poviat of the Podlasie province in the Polish Crown. The border ran today with the Podlega, Środkowa, Kapralska, Dalka and Skorupska doul streets. Warszawska and nearby ul. E. Orzeszkowej leads along the Biała River to ul. Jagiellonian.

In Teki Glinki there is a mention from 1748 about the construction of a boyar boy's cottage in Skorupy and mention of the village of Skorupy belonging to the Sobolewski estate from 1772. In the 18th century, Skorupy was a large boyar village with 29 houses. They lived here quite numerous treasury craftsmen working for the court. The proximity of Bialystok was favorable craft development.

The act of measuring the land of the villages of Skorupy with the villages of Halickie and Zaścianki was prepared in 1864, while the broadcasting act of purchased land Białostocko-Sokólski Poviat Court, specifying the list of owners and area of surplus along with the full value of the purchase, was issued in February 1868. A total of 26 peasants received over 422 tithes of different categories of land.

Industry in Skorupy appeared already in the 1860s together with the construction of a textile plant by Albrecht Adolfai Scharlotta Zoi from Riedlów Reich from the Polish Kingdom. It is not known when exactly the Reichs arrived in Białystok. In the 1920s and 1830s, the couple lived in Ozorków, a small town in the Zgierz poviat, where Albrecht worked as a dyer.

Before 1869, Reicho acquired land from Aleksander Kruzensztern, located between the Biała River and the road to Zabłudów (today ul. Nowowarszawska), west of the former development of the village of Skorupy (today partly estates at Nowowarszawska street).

The development of Bialystok in terms of demographics and economics after 1944 left its mark on the former village of Skorupy, where within a few decades new arable land in the suburbs began to develop at a rapid pace, spilling out of wastelands often planless, chaotic and in uncontrolled manner. This concerned especially the areas located east of the center of the former village between the old streets of Zaścieńska, Zbożowa and Kujawska, where a real thicket of single-family houses situated on plots arose, perpetuating with its characteristic outline and arrangement the old ownership divisions. Serious spatial changes in the former village of Skorupy also occurred in the 70s and 80s of the 20th century with the emergence of large investments - large-scale housing estates (Piasta I and Piasta II) and the construction of new urban thoroughfares, including today's ul. Piastowska and Jana Klemens Branicki. Construction movement after 1989 is continued by private entrepreneurs.

The area of the Skorupy district was defined by the Resolution of the Miejska Rada Narodowa in Białystok (city parliament in the communist period) of November 31, 1959 on establishing the districts of the city of Bialystok: currently the Skorupy district is concluded is within: railway track to Krynki, Szosa Zambrowska, Biała river and Dolistówka river. Skorupska street is an old trail along which the land border ran between the villages of Bojary and Skorupy.
