= King Sigismund Augustus 6th Secondary School in Białystok =

Coordinates: 53°08′05″N 23°10′01″E

VI High School - King Sigismund Augustus
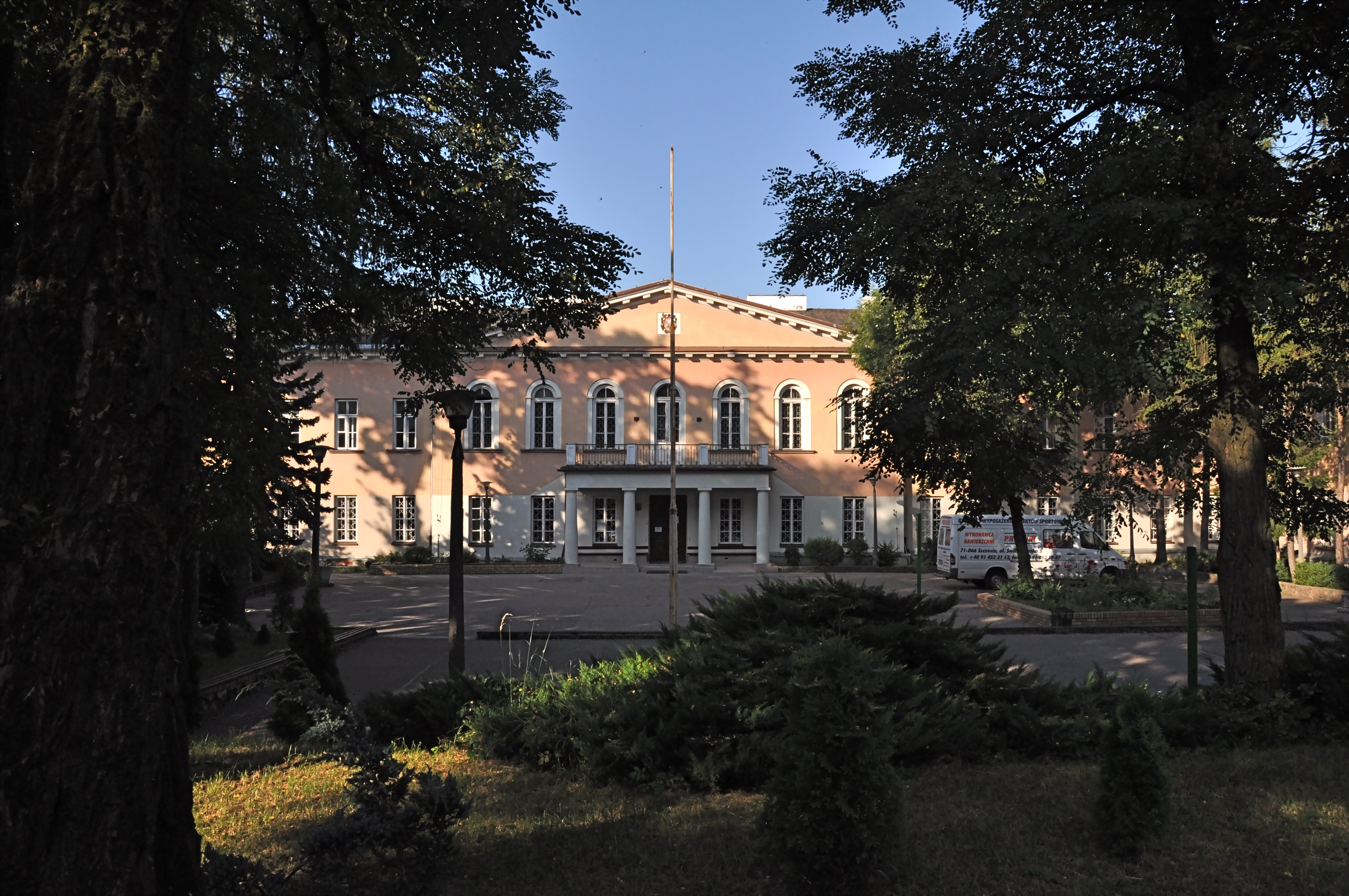
- Białystok; Poland

Information
- Type: Liceum ogólnokształcące
- Established: 1915
- Campus: Urban
- Website: http://www.vilo.Białystok.pl/

VI High School – King Sigismund Augustus is a secondary school in Warszawska Street, Bojary district of the city of Białystok in Poland.

== History ==
The history of the school dates back to 1777, when the National Education Commission approved the curriculum of the newly established Białystok sub-faculty school. The school was located at today's Kilińskiego Street. Until 1794, it was headed by Father Jan Michałowski. In 1796, as a result of the partitions, the school had to leave its previous location and, with the help of Izabela Branicka, it was moved to the building formerly occupied by the court theatre.

In 1802, as a result of the educational reform in the Russian Empire, the school was transformed into the Białystok Gymnasium, which entitled it to admission to higher education. In 1808, the gymnasium was moved to a brick building at the intersection of Warszawska and Pałacowa Streets. The location changed again in 1858, when the gymnasium moved to the current building of the VI LO - a classicist palace at 9 Kościelna Street (today 8 Warszawska Street). The building, built in 1831, was previously occupied by, among others, the headquarters of the Russian administration and a military hospital. Graduates of the Białystok Gymnasium include Ludwik Zamenhof, the creator of the Esperanto language, and Ignacy Hryniewiecki, the assassin of Tsar Alexander II.

In 1873, the profile of the institution was changed from a humanistic Gymnasium to a technical and natural Real School. The school gained new buildings by purchasing the buildings on today's Warszawska Street in 1893 and erecting new buildings on the square on Kościelna Street in 1895 and 1898. Both properties are part of the school to this day.

On November 29, 1915, a year after the outbreak of World War I, on the initiative of the Society for the Assistance of Polish Schools, a male and female Real Gymnasium was established in Białystok. After Poland regained independence, the boys' grammar school was placed in a small palace on Kościelna Street. Thanks to the efforts of the school's principal and MP, Father Stanisław Hałka, the grammar school was nationalized. It was named after King Zygmunt August.

The school was founded in 1915 and its alumni include the inventor of Esperanto. The school is named after the sixteenth century King Sigismund II Augustus.

The school was based in buildings that were the Realschule in the city. This school had started much earlier and was attended by L. L. Zamenhof from 1869 to 1871 when his family then moved to Warsaw. The other famous person who attended the school was Ignacy Hryniewiecki, the assassin of the Tzar of Russia Alexander II.

120 students from this school were involved in the Polish fight for independence in 1917–20.

World War II interrupted the school's activities, but in 1944 teaching returned to the neoclassical palace. It housed a boys' and a girls' grammar school. In 1958, the 1st General Secondary School was established in their place, and later, the 2nd and 3rd General Secondary Schools and the General Secondary School for Working People were located there.

In 2008, the school was opened as part of a Jewish Heritage Trail organised by local university students.
