= Osiedle Sienkiewicza, Białystok =

Sienkiewicza
- District (osiedle) of Białystok
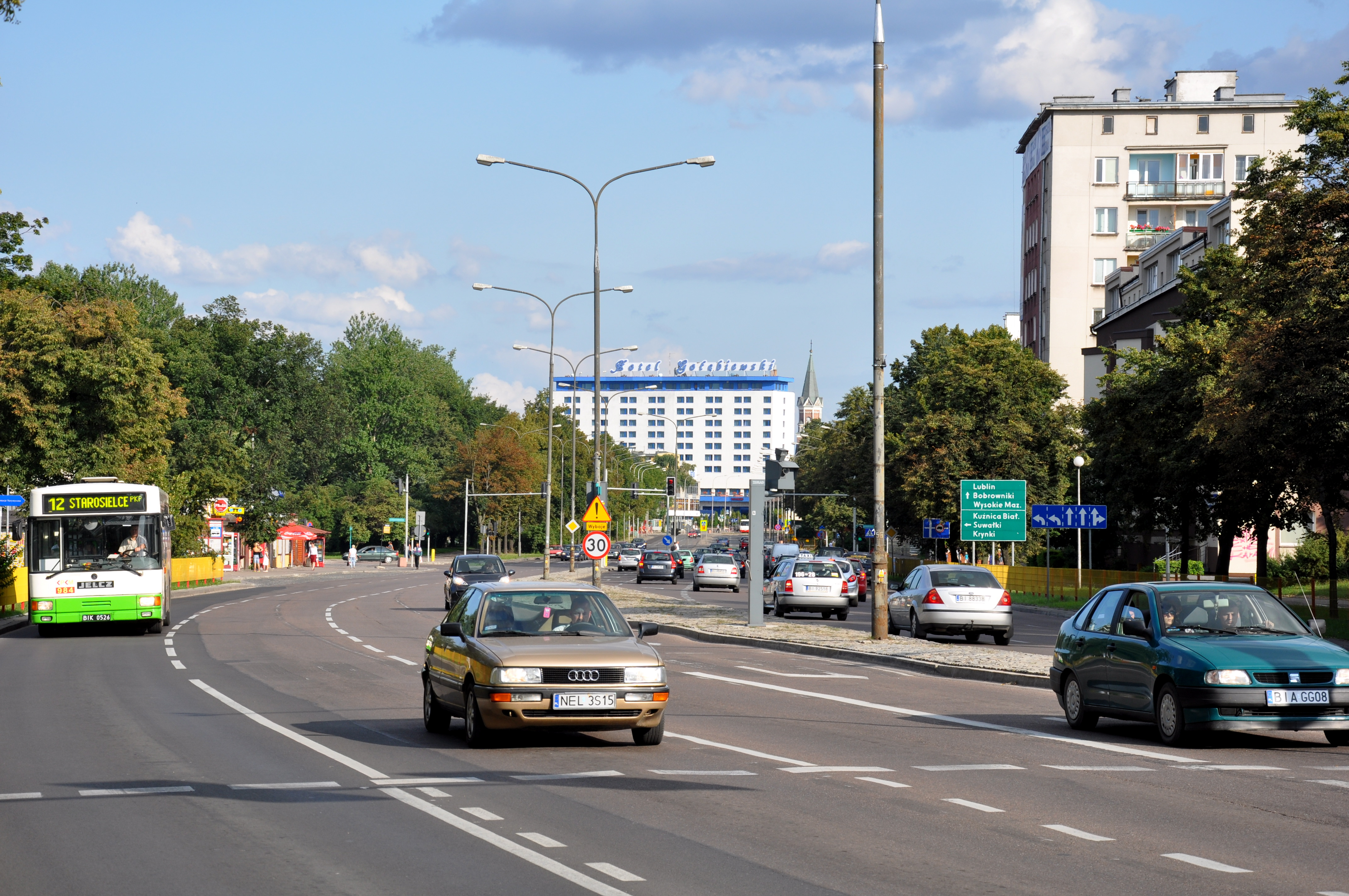
- Alle Pilsudski

- Location of Osiedle Sienkiewicza within Białystok
- Coordinates: 53°8′23″N 23°9′52″E
- Country: Poland
- Voivodeship: Podlaskie
- County/City: Białystok

Area
  - Total: 0.679 km^{2} (0.262 sq mi)
- Time zone: UTC+1 (CET)
  - Summer (DST): UTC+2 (CEST)
- Postal code: 15-xxx
- Area code: +48 85
- Website: http://www.bialystok.pl

Osiedle Sienkiewicza is one of the districts of the Polish city of Białystok. It is one of the smaller districts in terms of the area but is relatively densely populated. The district lies directly north to the city centre on the right bank of the Biala river (with the exception of a small segment of Pilsudski alley, which lies on the left bank). It is named after Henryk Sienkiewicz, whose statue can be found in the district.

== History ==
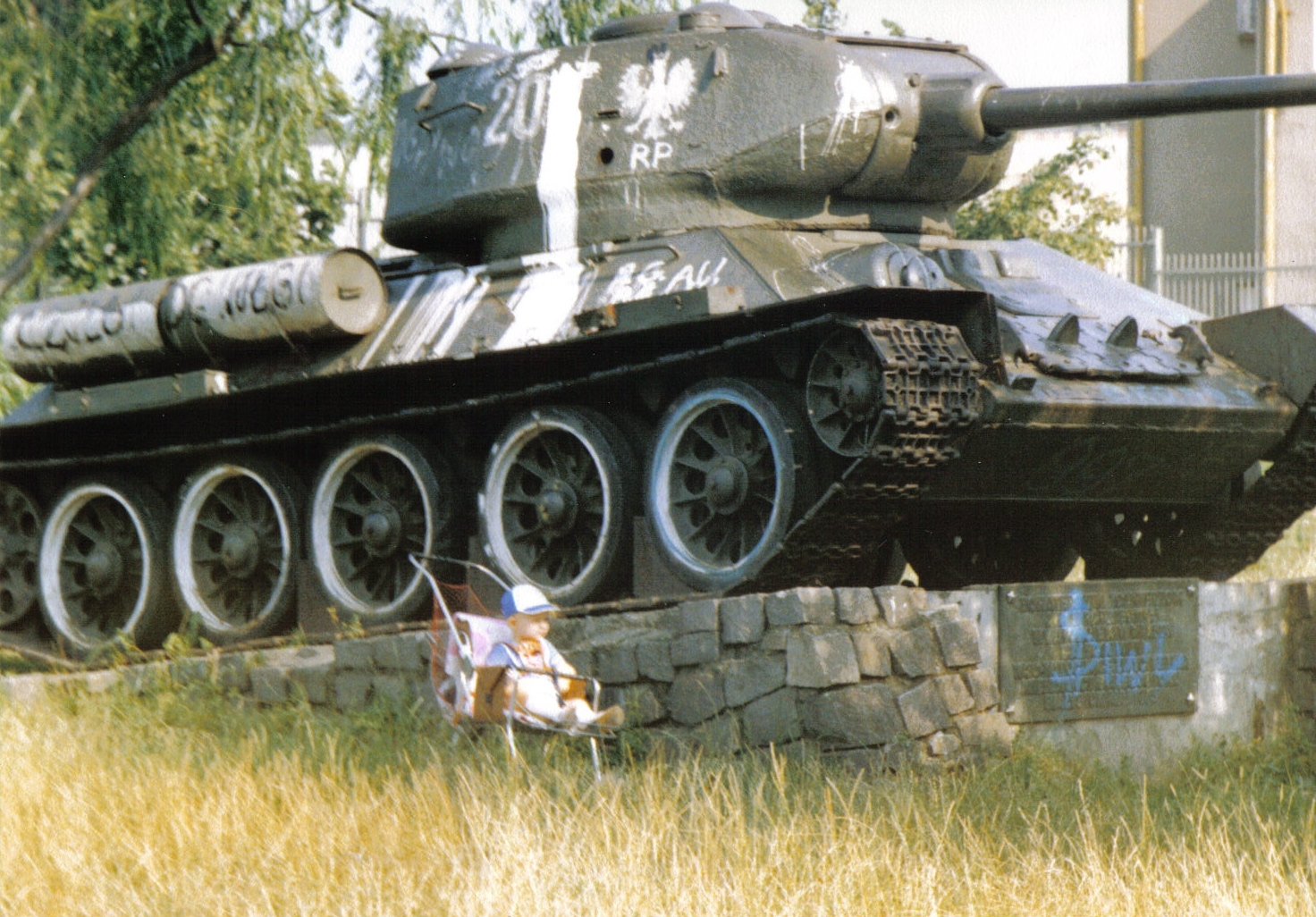
A Soviet tank which stood on Zankiewicz square for several decades; now in a museum

The area comprises what used to be the northern part of the Białystok Ghetto, a Jewish ghetto created by Nazi German occupying forces during World War II. On 20 August 1943 the ghetto was pacified, which resulted in a total destruction of the area - less than 20 buildings from before that period have survived until now. Until the end of the war, the southern part of the district around Jurowiecka Street functioned as an industrial zone. Even before the war, residents viewed the area as a nuisance, as local textile factories discharged their wastewater into the Biała River, severely harming public health. After the war, no effort was made to rebuild the factories that had been destroyed, and the area’s redevelopment proceeded slowly. Clearing the rubble continued until the late 1950s.

In 1949, several plots on Fabryczna Street, near its intersection with Jurowiecka Street—formerly the sites of businesses such as Mojżesz Alpern’s factory and Noach Wasilkowski’s Cloth and Blanket Factory—were leased by the PKS bus monopoly. A service station, warehouses, and an administration building were constructed there in 1951, followed later by a bus station with a depot, which remained in operation until 1987.

In 1952, a sports hall for the "Budowlani Białystok" club (renamed "Jagiellonia" in 1957) was built on Jurowiecka Street, and ten years later, the Janusz Kusociński stadium opened nearby. The area between the stadium and Sienkiewicza Street was tidied up only in the early 1970s, with paving and flowerbeds and benches installed. In 1973, for the Harvest Festival, spectacular floral decorations were installed there. The square was named XXX Anniversary of the Polish People's Republic, and a gallery of distinguished persons was displayed on special plaques. The local residents called it Assembly Square. Antiques fairs, for example, were held there. Closer to Sienkiewicza Street, car repair shops were located.

After 1956, when housing cooperatives in Poland were allowed to operate on a larger scale, the Białystok Housing Cooperative (Polish: Białostocka Społdzielnia Mieszkaniowa) began investing in the territory of the former ghetto. In 1958, construction of the Sienkiewicza Housing Estate began at 4a Nowogródzka Street, encompassing the eastern part of the ghetto, the area with a predominance of wooden buildings, the area where the insurgents had resisted in August 1943.

On 9 March 1989 a train carrying chlorine was derailed on the railway bordering the district. If the chlorine tanks had opened much of the population of the city would have been killed, but the emergency was successfully dealt with by fire brigade. This event is commemorated by a statue standing on Poleska street where the accident took place.

The area now consists of urban greenery, public buildings and a housing estate. The latter consists mainly of four- and eleven-storey blocks of flats administered by one housing association - Białostocka Społdzielnia Mieszkaniowa (BSM). There are also several buildings owned by other associations as well as private proprietors.
