= Osiedle Piasta II, Białystok =

Piasta II
- District (osiedle) of Białystok
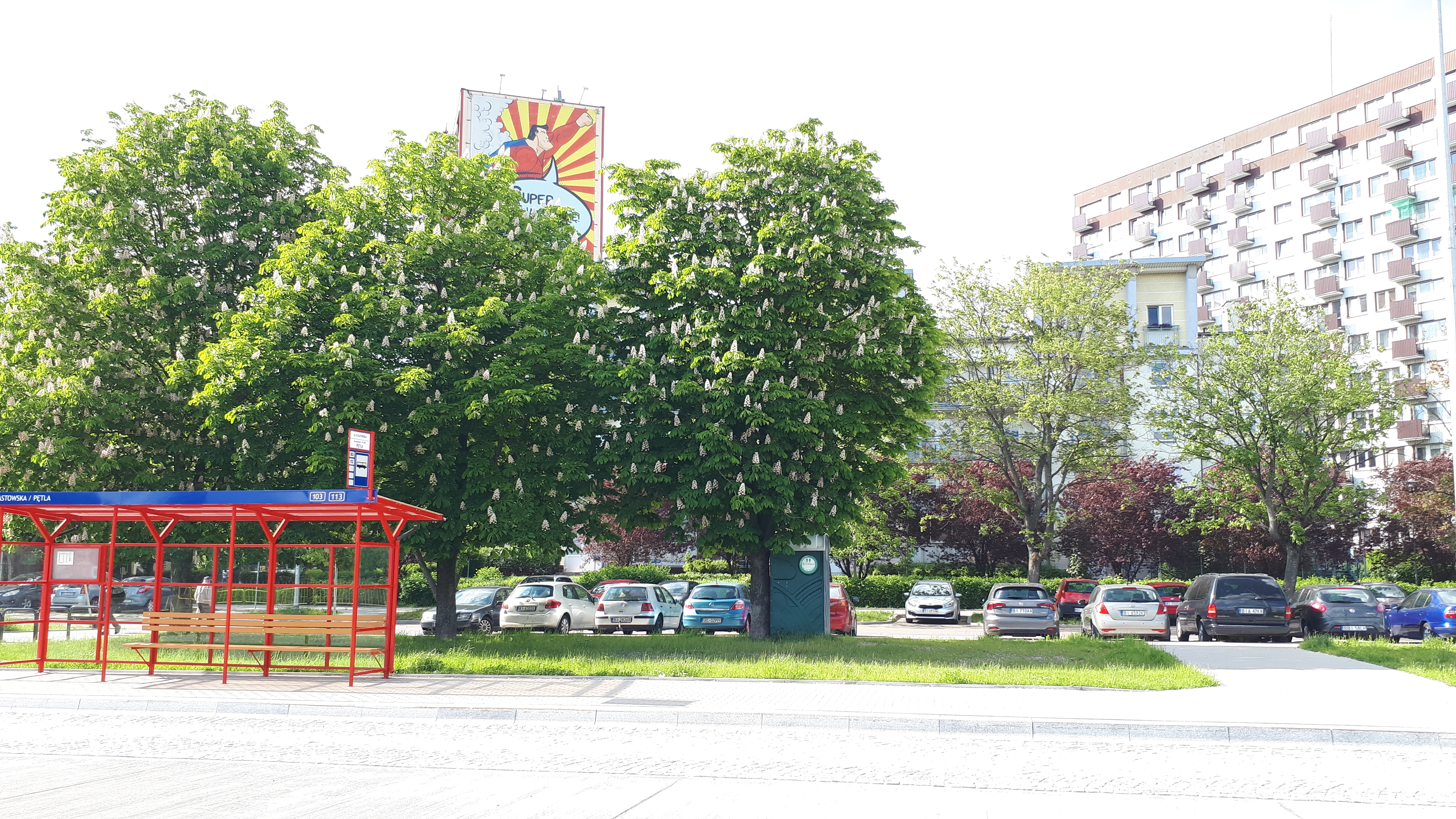

- Location of Piasta II within Białystok
- Coordinates: 53°07′44″N 23°10′54″E
- Country: Poland
- Voivodeship: Podlaskie
- City: Białystok

Area
  - Total: 0.355 km^{2} (0.137 sq mi)

Osiedle Piasta II is one of the districts of the Polish city of Białystok. Named after the royal Piast dynasty. District with the smallest area in Bialystok.
