= Kościuszko Market Square =

Square in Białystok, Poland

Kościuszko Square
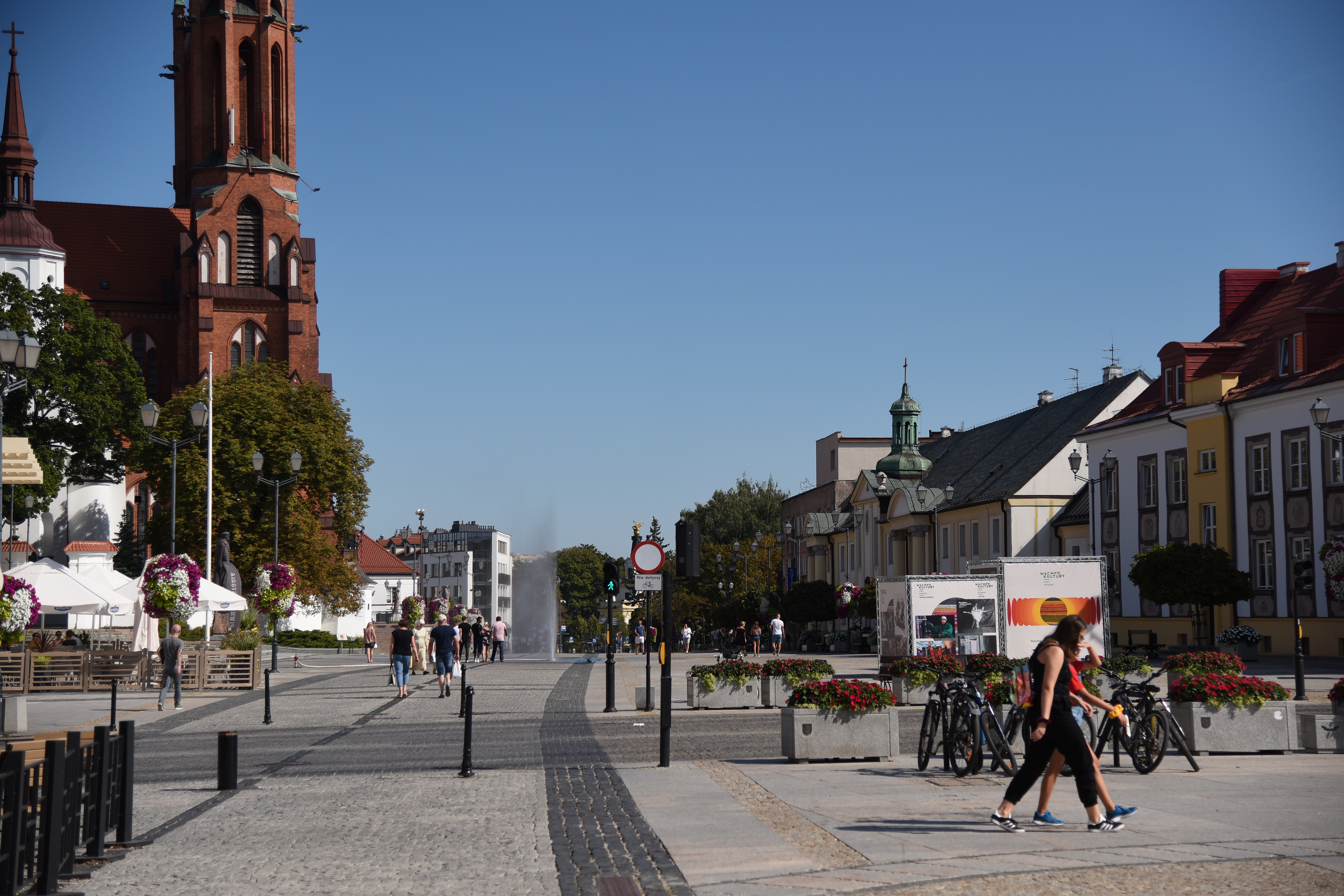
- Interactive map of Kościuszko Square
- Native name: Rynek Kościuszki (Polish)
- Former name: Bazarna Square
- Type: Square
- Maintained by: Białystok City Hall
- Location: Centrum district, Białystok, Poland
- Coordinates: 53°07′55″N 23°09′46″E

Kościuszko Square (Polish: Rynek Kościuszki) is the representative and central square of Białystok, capital of Podlaskie Voivodeship in north-eastern Poland, stretching from John Paul II Square, passing into the southern frontage with Suraska Street, while the northern frontage into Lipowa Street from the intersection with Spółdzielcza Street. The western frontage of Kościuszko Square is formed by the building line of buildings between Suraska Street and Lipowa Street at the level of Spółdzielcza Street.

== History ==
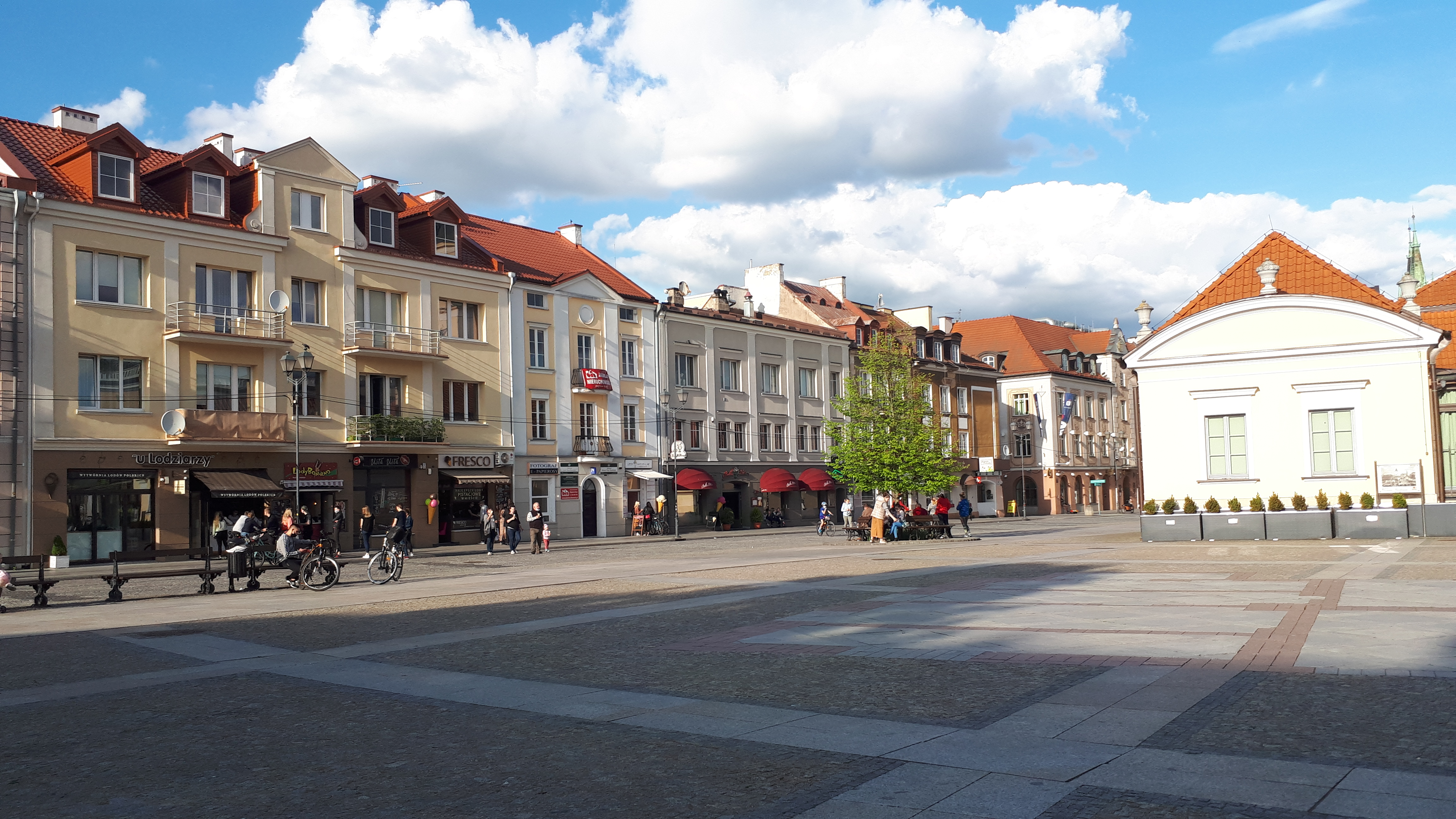
View of the square, May 2020

The beginnings of the Białystok Market Square date back to the 15th century. It was created at the intersection of roads leading to Suraż, Wasilków and Choroszcz. With time around spontaneously created square, without a clearly defined plan, buildings began to grow. About In 1547, in the south-eastern part of it, a wooden church was built, in place of the present buildings of the monastery of the Sisters of Mercy.

In 1708, the square was given its final shape. Its elongated, slightly curved frontage -south and north - they narrowed at the central point of the square so that it divided into two parts. The first of them eastern, clearly associated with the royal residence and. The area was occupied of parish church there. Over time, the most important foundations appeared next to him Branicki - monastery and hospital. The second part – the west, with a centrally located town hall, was associated with city functions.

Work started in 1726 and was interrupted by two great fires in 1753. Most of the northern part of the city was destroyed. By rebuilding the Market Square, Jan Klemens Branicki made sure that its buildings were harmonious. All buildings were made of brick or were made of brick front wall. Street inlets were highlighted with representative, two-story houses. At the corners of Wasilkowska Street (now Sienkiewicza) stood the tenement house "Pod Łosiem" and manor house (currently Astoria restaurant). In 1892 a fountain was built at the square, and in 1959 it was moved to its current place.

In 1919, the square name changed from Bazarna to Kosciuszko after Tadeusz Kościuszko. In 1925 they were made in this parts of the city center cleaning works. After the occupation of Bialystok by the Soviets, the market radically changed its face. First, in 1940, its name was changed. Along with Piłsudskiego Street (Lipowa) and Kilińskiego, the square was changed Sovetskaya Street. After the occupation of Bialystok by the Germans the square once again changed its name to Gross Markt (Great Market). In the years 1941–1944 the entire downtown of Białystok was destroyed as well as most of the buildings in the square.

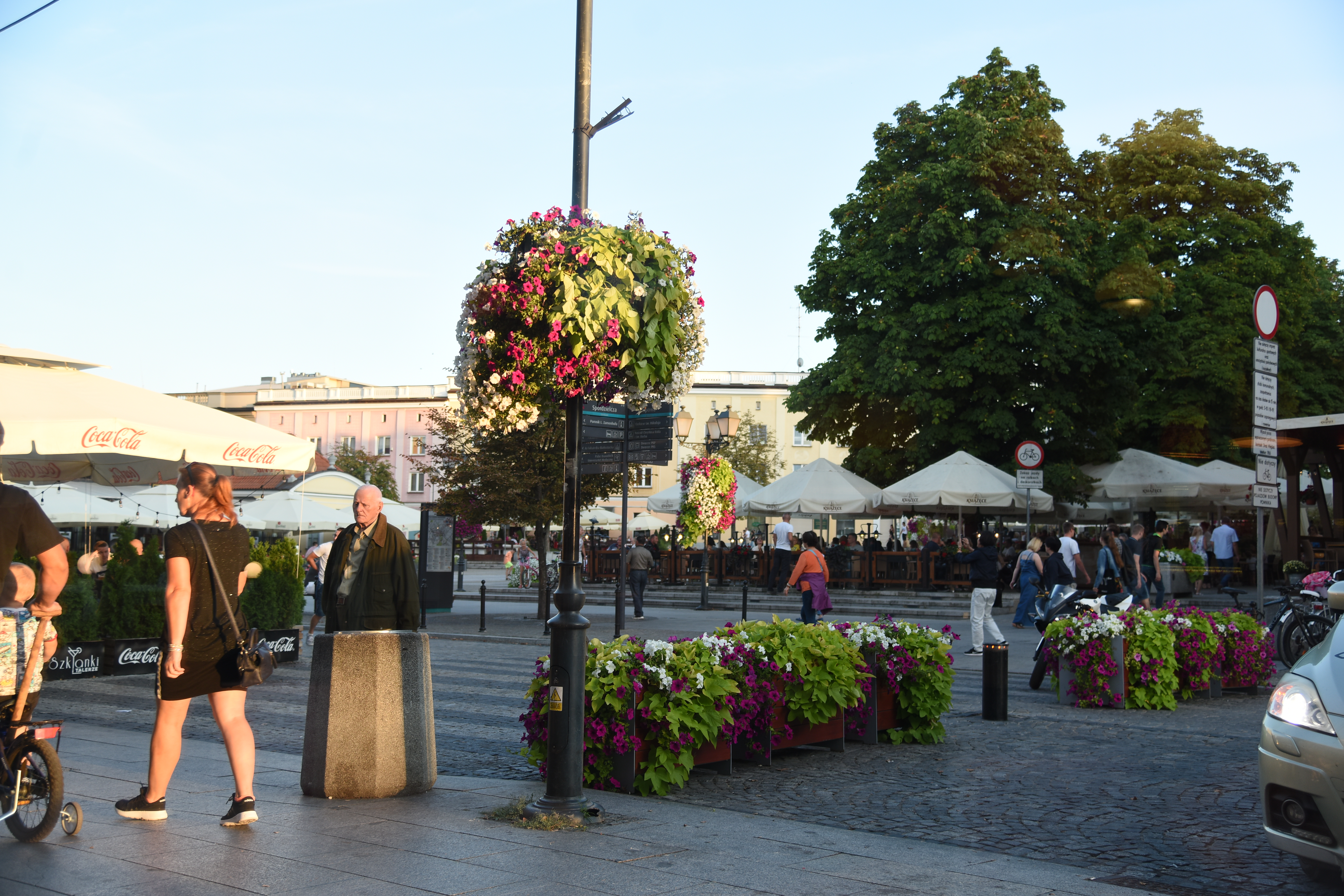
View of the square, August 2019

The reconstruction was carried out in the years 1945–1958. The main authors were Władysław Paszkowski and Stanisław Bukowski and Zenon Filipczuk. Initially, the work was carried out in an uncoordinated manner. Some of the buildings on the northern frontage were rebuilt using the economic method, while the afternoon frontage was filled with buildings in the style of classical modernism. As a result, their actions were rebuilt in the western and northern part in the spirit of historicism, referring to the architecture of the 1920s. In the northern frontage, the most interesting buildings were reconstructed according to the plans of Stanisaw Bukowski and Zenon Filipczuk: the armory, which housed the State Archives in Bialystok and the Astoria restaurant. On the other side, the building at 3 Sienkiewicza Street was built and used as the former seat of the Polish-Soviet Friendship Society and the International Press Club and the EMPiK. In the eastern part of the southern frontage, the reconstructed monastery of the Sisters of Mercy, called the House of St. Marcin. At that time, the remaining frontages of the western part of the Kościuszko Market Square were recreated, preserving the former line of development, while raising its scale while southern frontage was built in the style of monumental socialist realism, based on pre-war modernism.

In the western part a modernist bank building (Rynek Kosciuszki 7), reminiscent of the Art Deco style, and the socialist realism building of PPede (Rynek Kościuszki 15) which was the first department store in Białystok as well as five post-war tenement houses in the historicist style, which were decorated in the 1970s with the Sgraffito technique. The spatial functions of the square have changed few times throughout its history. After the war the functions of the square have changed as well. From its early days up to the existence of the Second Polish Republic, the western side of the square had economic function, as the central marketplace in the town. During the existence of the Second Republic the western side was also used as a bus terminal for the municipal but operator. The eastern side had ceremonial-religious function during the existence of the Second Republic and was used for ceremonies and celebrations. Following the war, during the Polish People's Republic period, this has changed: the eastern side lost its ceremonial function as it moved to the newly built Party Square and Skłodowskiej-Curie Avenue while the western side had a mixed function of economic and recreation uses; the marketplace eliminated and in that territory a recreational area constructed with trees and benches in addition to economic function in the form of shops in the ground floors of the surrounding buildings.

Following the end of communism in Poland the and the economic crisis that the city experienced, the square suffered from negligence and there were complaints of bad smells from the park that was located at the western side. On the other hand the western side of square regained its ceremonial function with state ceremonies began taking place there again. In addition, a monument of Józef Piłsudski was placed in the square. In 2007-2008 the square had passed through a major reconstruction which revitalised the square. Most notably it was closed for traffic and became a carfree pedestrian zone. The park on the western side of the square was demolished and flooring was placed in its place.

== Overview ==
=== Western frontages ===
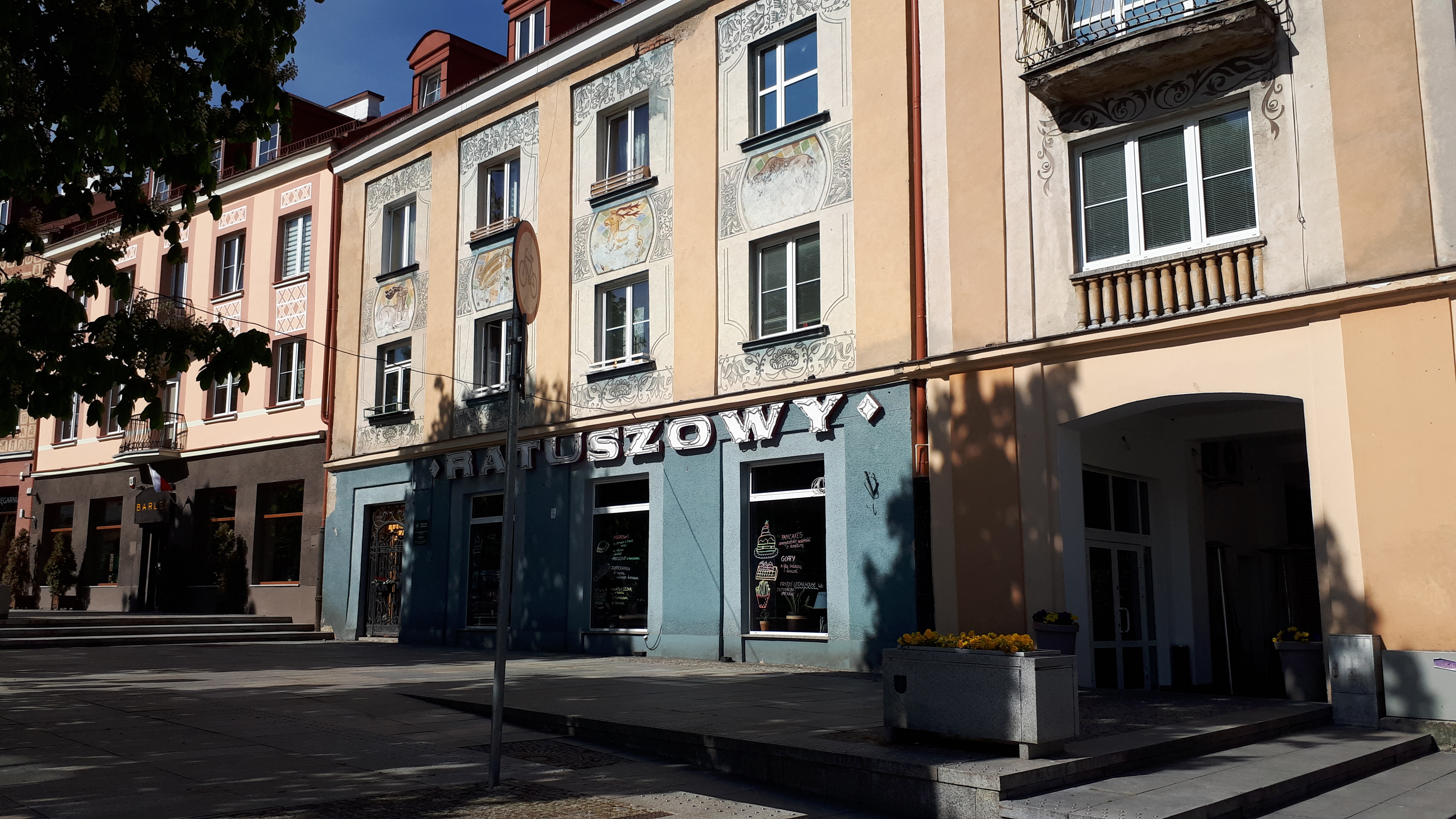
Western frontage, May 2020

The western side of the square forms the building line between Suraska Lipowa streets, at the height of Spółdzielcza Street. Behind the colorful facades of the tenement houses that were rebuilt after the war, under which Bialystok painters and visiting painters put up for sale all summer months, found a gallery, a press salon, the Wedel cafe (formerly Marszand's favorite cafe here), the Akcent bookshop and cafe, pizzeria Chilli Pizza.

Facades of tenement houses are decorated with sgraffito decorations. Next to plant elements, animal images, muses figures are portraits of people distinguished for the region:

- Jan Krzysztof Kluk - naturalist from Ciechanowiec, author of "The Dictionary of Plants".
- Princess Anna Jabłonowska of Siemiatycze - a known reformer of the Enlightenment period,
- Adrian Krzyżanowski - mathematician, physicist and historian, born in Dąbrowa Białostocka,
- Krzysztof Lach Szyrma, a writer and political scientist from Olecko,
- Antoni Stanisław Wagi, an entomologist from Grabowo.

=== Northern frontage ===
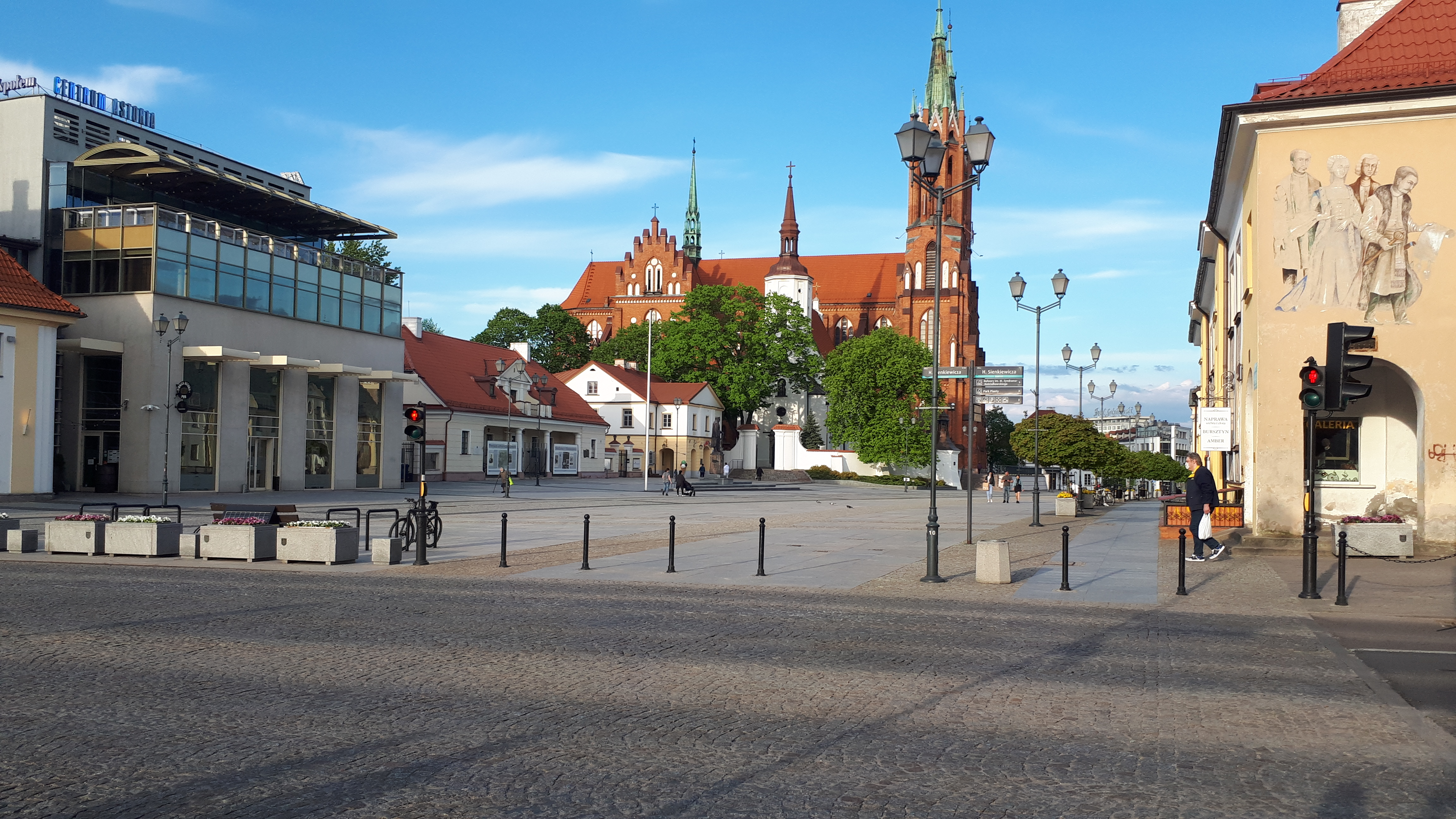
View towards the northern frontage, May 2020

The northern frontage (in the eastern part) begins from John Paul II Square to the intersection with Sienkiewicza Street. A representative promenade preserved in the form of a street.

- Cathedral Basilica of the Assumption of the Blessed Virgin Mary (corner of Kościelna Street)
- Kościuszko Square 2 - Ton Cinema
- Kościuszko Square 4 - Cekhauz, which housed the State Archives, in front of which is currently a monument of J. Piłsudski,
- Kościuszko Square 6 - Astoria restaurant (corner of Sienkiewicza street),

The northern frontage (in the western part) of Kościuszko Square starts from Sienkiewicza Street and runs towards Lipowa Street (to the intersection with Spółdzielcza Street).

- Kościuszko Square 8 - EMPIK (corner of H. Sienkiewicza street),
- Kościuszko Square 16 - Branch No.1 of PKO Bank Polski (corner of Zamenhofa Street),
- Kościuszko Square 24 - Almatur (travel agency).

=== Southern frontage ===
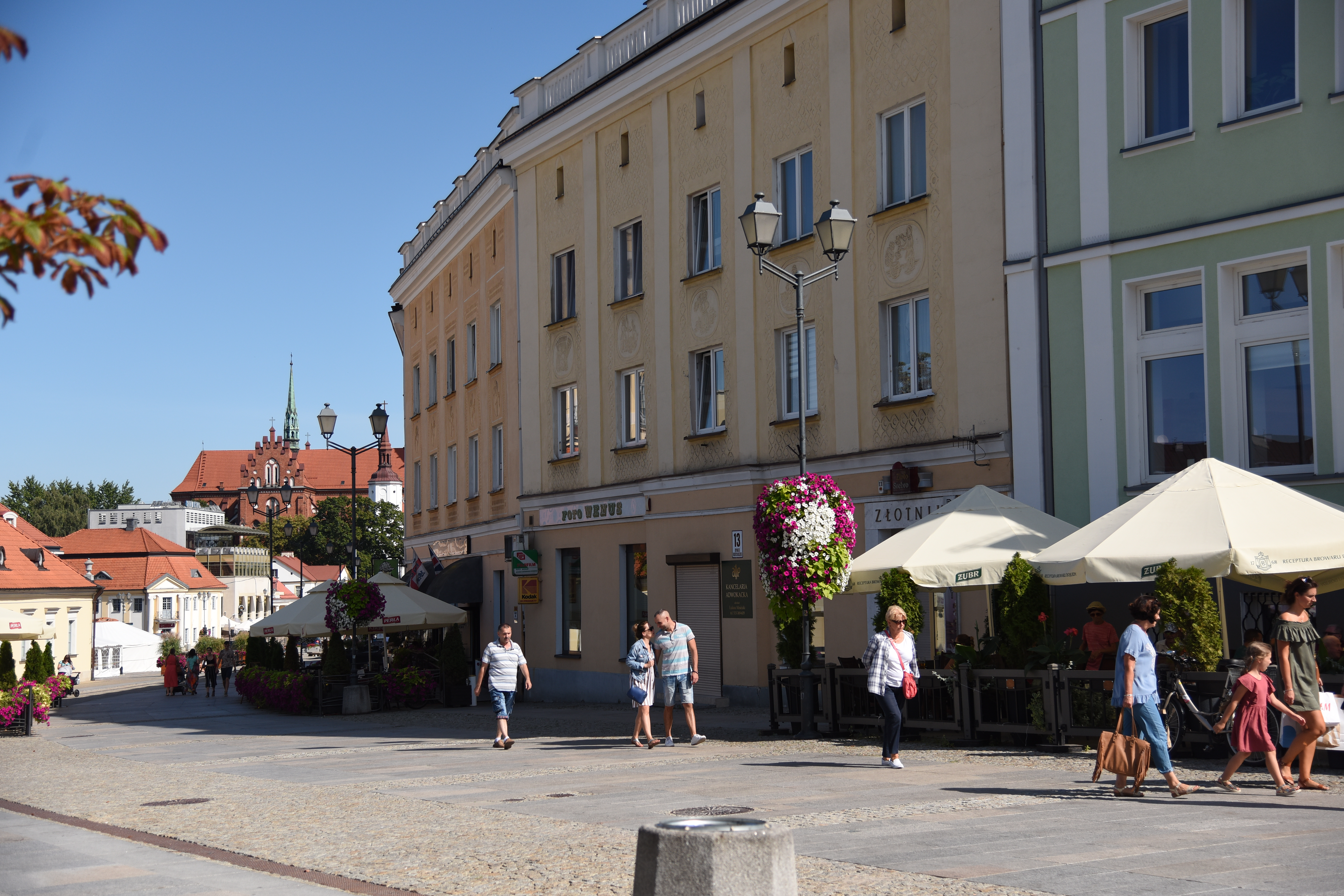
View of the southern frontage and building number 13

- Kościuszko Square 5 - historic monastery of the Sisters of Mercy of St. Vincent.
- Kościuszko Square 7 - Bank BPH.
- Kościuszko Square 9 - Board of Education.
- Kościuszko Square 11 - former "Nowy" Shopping Center (General Department Store), currently Bierhalle restaurant. Opened in 1955, the project was ready as early as 1949.
- Kościuszko Square 13 - Polish Post Office, "Czerwony Piano" cafe, "Złotnictwo" jewelry store.
- Kościuszko Square 15 - Podlasie beer house and bar.

=== Old ratusz ===
The Białystok town hall (Polish: Ratusz) was never the seat of city authorities, but only served a commercial function. Founded by Jan Klemens Branicki, it was supposed to compose the space of the market square and constitute its architectural dominance. Its construction took place in several stages. In 1745, a single-storey building covered with a mansard roof was erected. It housed 10 shops leased to local Jews. In 1761, one storey of the tower was built, raised to its current height in 1798. In 1868, a clock appeared on the tower. Following the regaining of independence and the establishment of the Second Polish Republic, the building continued to have economic function and had more than 100 shops in it. In 1940 the Red Army demolished the building as the Soviet regime to hold military parades and ceremonies there. There was also a suggestion to erect a monument for Joseph Stalin in its place. In 1953 as a result of the efforts of the first conservator of Białystok after the war, Władysław Paszkowski, a permission was given to re-build the structure. The author of the project was Zofia Chojnacka and the interior was designed by Stanisław Bukowski. Following its completion in 1958 the Podlaskie Museum has its headquarters there.
