= Osiedle Bojary, Białystok =

Bojary
- District (osiedle) of Białystok
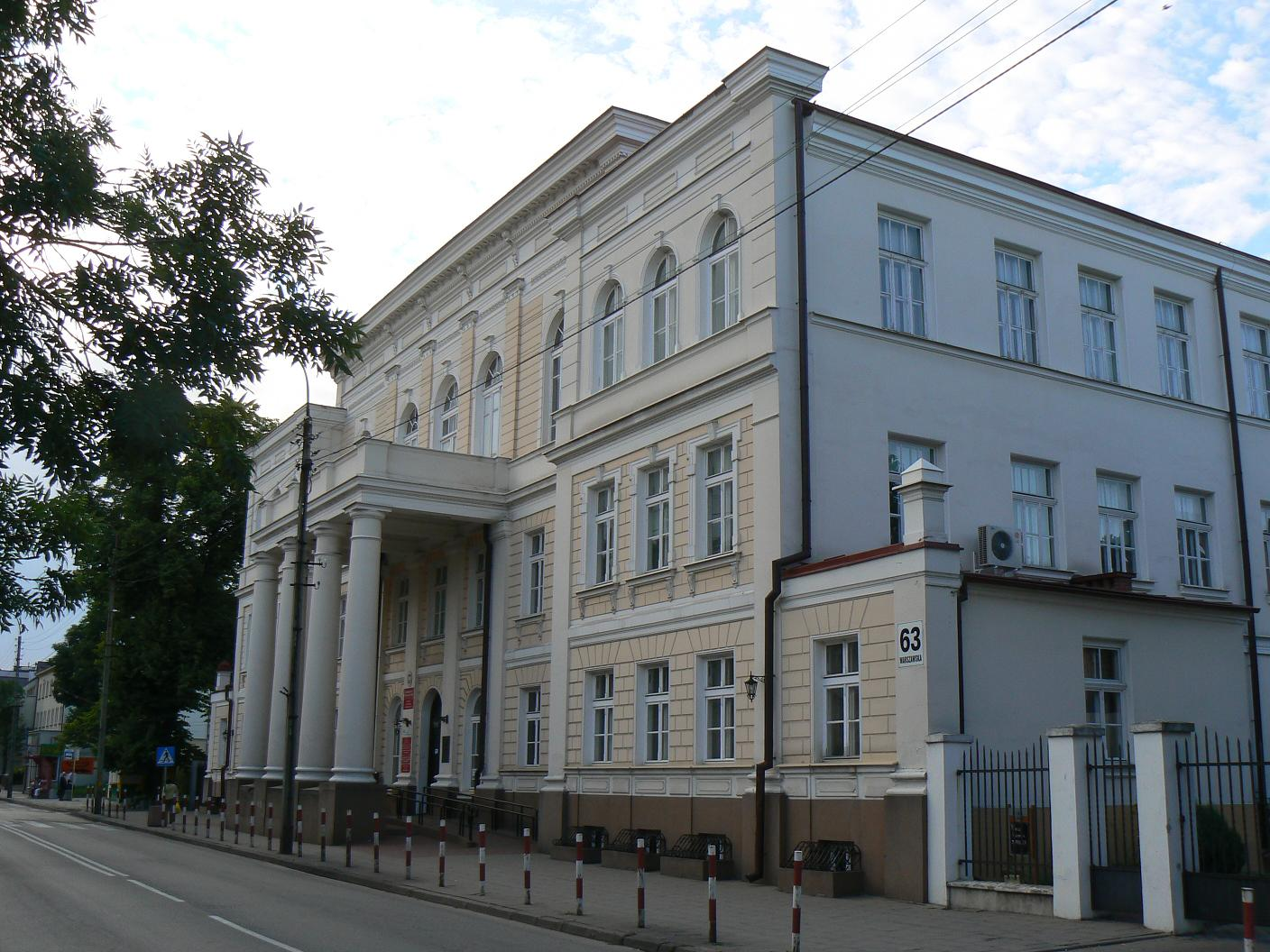
- ul. Warszawska 63

- Location of Osiedle Bojary within Białystok
- Coordinates: 53°8′5″N 23°10′32″E
- Country: Poland
- Voivodeship: Podlaskie
- County/City: Białystok

Area
  - Total: 1.224 km^{2} (0.473 sq mi)
- Time zone: UTC+1 (CET)
  - Summer (DST): UTC+2 (CEST)
- Postal code: 15-xxx
- Area code: +48 85
- Website: http://www.bialystok.pl

Bojary is one of the districts of the Polish city of Białystok.

== History ==
Bojary is first mentioned on December 5, 1581. The then owner of the Białystok estate, Piotr Wiesiołowski mentions the village under the name Miłosze. This tiny settlement was located along today's Warszawska Street on its section from Sienkiewicza to Pałacowa Street. Inhabitants of the village, apart from cottages and farms, had a considerable area of arable land. They stretched from Słonimska St. to Sobieskiego St. In the second half of the 18th century the territories of Bojary were incorporated to the city of Bialystok. Branicki enlarged the city but for many years the section of Warszawska Street, the location high school, a post office, hospital, bank or Trylling Palace was called Bojarska Street. Despite the incarnation of the term 'Bojary', the inclusion of today's Warszawska Street (from Pałacowa to Sienkiewicza) to the city, the lives of the inhabitants retained their rural character until the partitions. Some of the unique road network has survived, several houses. If the street meanders, has unusual faults (like the connection between Starobojarska and Sobieskiego Street) it is likely that it is an ancient way:

- Skorupska Street - as a former border between the Crown of the Polish Kingdom and the Grand Duchy of Lithuania (1569-1795)
- Kraszewskiego Street - route to the Monastery in Supraśl
- Gliniana Street - based on former excavation, clay was mined here for centuries, through which the street clearly goes down
- Sobieskiego Street - road dividing arable land.
