= Media in Białystok =

This is a sub-article to Białystok

Białystok has a wide variety of media outlets serving the city and surrounding region. There are two locally published daily newspapers, Gazeta Współczesna (36.3% market share) and Kurier Poranny (20.3% market share). In addition two national papers have local bureaus. There are a number of national and locally produced television and radio channels available both over-the-air from the nearby RTCN Białystok (Krynice) Mast, the seventh highest structure in Poland, in addition to transmitter sites within the city. There is also a cable television system available within the city. The city has two campus radio stations; Radiosupeł at the Medical University of Białystok and Radio Akadera at the Białystok Technical University.

== History ==
As a result of the city's national, religious and political diversity pre-war Białystok had a rich press offering. In the years 1919-1939, over 100 different newspapers and magazines were published in the city. Usually, their lifespan was short - a few or a dozen editions. A few managed to survive a few months, and the exceptions were periodicals that were published continuously for several or a dozen years. Of the titles published in interwar Białystok, about 60 were in Yiddish and at least 2 in Russian. In terms of the development of the Jewish press in the years 1937-1938, four Jewish dailies were published in the city at the same time, as well as weeklies and monthlies. The daily "Golos Bielostok" was particularly hated by Polish right circles. It appeared on the market in January 1919, this Russian-language newspaper edited by Józef Zeligman was an organ of the Jewish intelligentsia and entrepreneurs. It supported a plebiscite on the statehood of Białystok and the creation of a free city based on the model of Free City of Danzig. It called for a boycott of the first elections to the Białystok City Council. Then it clearly declined: it became a weekly, later a biweekly. The last issue appeared in July 1920. The best edited and most stable in terms of economy was the daily Unzer Leben, published in the years 1919-1939 and was headed by Pesach Kaplan. From November 1931, the newspaper had its own printing house at 23 Kilińskiego Street. The other Jewish papers were Bialystoker Idyszer Ownt Kurier (Białostocka Gazeta Codzienna), Die Welt (29 Sienkiewicza street) and Unzer Weg. Known Jewish journalists included Abraham Zbar and Jakub Szapiro.

Polish intelligentsia circles had been planning to create a daily presenting the Polish point of view since December 1918, which at that time - in the face of approaching independence - seemed necessary. Four figures are associated with this undertaking: Konstanty Kosinski, Władysław Olszynski, Benedykt Filipowicz and Karol Tołłoczko. At the turn of January and February 1919, the Polish Society for the Promotion of Press and Reading was established. It also established contacts with Warsaw publishing houses in order to attract Polish typesetters to Białystok. The first issue of "Dziennik Białostocki" appeared on April 6, 1919 and ceased with the occupation of the city in World War II. The daily sharply contradicted with the theses contained in Golos Bielostok: it condemned the attitude of the Jewish community and emphasized the Polishness of Białystok. On state holidays editions, it emphasized the official narrative in holidays-related content. Another general Polish newspaper was Kurier Białostocki.

Many mutations of Warsaw dailies were published in the interwar period: "Kurjer Białostocki ABC", "Gazeta Białostocka - Dzień Dobry", "Ostatnie Wiadomości Białostockie". Political groups also tried to publish their own local newspapers, for example: "Białostocki Głos Codzienny" (National Workers' Party), "Białostockie Nowiny Codzienne" (National Democracy), "Robotnik Białostocki" (Polish Socialist Party), "Przegląd Kresowy" (Nonpartisan Bloc for Cooperation with the Government). Attempts to create a stable newspaper available in all the towns of the Białystok Voivodeship were unsuccessful. Other newspapers included "Białostocki Kurier Nowości " (17 Piłsudskiego street), "Dziś" (17 Kilińskiego street), "Echo Białostockie" (1 Kupiecka street), "Express Białostocki" (5 Sienkiewicza street), "Jutrzenka Białostocka" (49 Piłsudskiego street).

During the occupation of the city in World War II by Soviet Union and then Nazi Germany, the occupation authorities shut down the existing newspapers, allowing only government-controlled newspaper. The official newspaper of the Belastok Region Party Committee and Białystok City Party Committee of the Communist Party of Byelorussia was Wyzwolony Białystok, which at the end of 1939 renamed to Wolna Praca, published in Belarusian and Polish languages. The Soviets also sanctioned the establishing of a Yiddish newspaper, the Der Bialistoker Shtern.

== Newspapers ==
There are two major newspapers covering the city:

- Gazeta Współczesna; a daily paper with a 36.3% market share
- Kurier Poranny; a daily paper with a 20.3% market share

In addition, there are a number of national newspapers which cover events in the city:

- Rzeczpospolita; a daily paper published in Warsaw
- Gazeta Wyborcza; a daily paper published in Warsaw, but with a bureau in the city and a local edition, (Gazeta Wyborcza Białystok)

There are a number of weekly newspapers covering the city:

- Teraz Białystok; a weekly paper in Polish
- Niva; a weekly paper in the Belarusian language
- Czasopis; a weekly paper in the Belarusian language
- Przegląd Prawosławny; a monthly magazine discussing Orthodox issues

== Television ==
A number of national and regional channels are available both over-the-air from the nearby RTCN Białystok (Krynice) Mast, the seventh highest structure in Poland, and on cable television:

- TVP1, Telewizja Polska S.A.; The primary channel of Poland's national public broadcaster.
- TVP2, Telewizja Polska S.A.; An entertainment channel of Poland's national public broadcaster.
- TVP Info/TVP Białystok, Telewizja Polska S.A.; A channel of Poland's national public broadcaster focusing on the regions of Poland. Locally created programming is generated in Białystok.

=== Defunct ===
- Telewizja Jard (formerly Białostocka Telewizja Miejska - BTM)
- Podlaska Telewizja (PTV); A privately owned, regional cable channel.

== Radio ==
A number of radio stations are available in the city:

- Polskie Radio Program I from Polskie Radio S.A.
- Polskie Radio Program III from Polskie Radio S.A.
- Białoruskie Radio Racja from Białoruskie Centrum Informacyjne Sp. z o.o.
- Polskie Radio Białystok from Regionalna Rozgłośnia w Białymstoku "Radio Białystok" S.A.
- RMF FM from Radio Muzyka Fakty Sp. z o.o.
- Radio Maryja from the Warsaw Province of the Congregation of the Most Holy Redeemer
- Radio ZET from Radio ZET Sp. z o.o.
- Radio Jard
- Radio Jard II
- Radio Eska Białystok – 90,6 FM
- Radio VOX FM Białystok – 103,3 MHz
- Radio Złote Przeboje - 101,0 MHz
- Radio Orthodoxia
- Radiosupeł (a Campus radio station at Medical University of Białystok)
- Radio Akadera (a Campus radio station at Białystok Technical University) 87,7 MHz

“Akadera” - BTU Radio Station is a university radio station established in 1964 covering the city of Białystok and the area of 50 km around it. The program of the Station focuses, first of all, on university students and their environment. The Station’ s journalists pay great attention to city life issues especially those concerning young people. “Akadera” Radio program is created by professional staff in cooperation with student journalists from Bialystok's universities and colleges. It is a commercial station and has been fully licensed since 1994. In 2003 it became a member of a nationwide association of “Polish Academic Radio Stations” embracing all the licensed university radio stations.

== Belarusian minority and exiled media ==
Białystok is the capital of the Podlaskie Voivodeship where Belarusian minority lives. This minority has its own media published in Belarusian language:

- Niva; a weekly paper
- Czasopis; a monthly magazine
- Białoruskie Radio Racja; cross-border radio station covering Belarusian and Polish common issues and local life

After Presidential elections in Belarus in 2020, mass protests and increased repressions number of Belarusian independent media were forced to leave the country because of security reasons. Some of them had chosen Białystok as their new home because of this city location very close to the Belarusian border and because of already existing Belarusian minority and diaspora.

In 2023 exiled Belarusian media working from Białystok are:

- Hrodna.life; daily digital media outlet from Hrodna published both in Belarusian and Russian language
- MOST; new media for Belarusian migrants in Poland created by group of exiled journalists from different media
- Palatno; website about Belarusian regions created in exile by group of regional journalists
- 6vt.by; video creators from Mahilyow who are used to create content about politics, local issues and Belarusian history
