= Bolesław Augustowicz =

- Born: June 24, 1912
- Died: May 26, 1995 (aged 82); Auckland
- Known for: photography

Bolesław Augustowicz (24 June 1912 – 26 May 1995), also known as Bolesław Augustis, was an Eastern European photographer specialising in street photography. He worked in Poland documenting life in the pre-World War II Polish city of Bialystok and, later, in Auckland, New Zealand.

Boleslaw was born in 1912 to Polish parents living in Russia. He arrived in Bialystok from Novosibirsk in 1932 at the age of twenty with his parents and siblings. Having already learnt some photography in Russia, he initially worked as an assistant in the Foto-Film studio of Józef Neuhüttler. From 1935 to 1939, Boleslaw was the operator of the studio Polonia Film, located in Kiliński Street, Bialystok. Boleslaw's photographs record everyday activities, special occasions, and political activity in the city, particularly in Kiliński, Lipowa and Palacowa streets.

In 1939, the Soviet Union invaded Eastern Poland and Boreslaw's father was arrested and deported to Minsk. Not long after, Boreslaw was also arrested by the Soviet NKVD secret police and deported to Siberia.

Boleslaw travelled to New Zealand from the United Kingdom in 1949 on board the Rangitoto. After his arrival in New Zealand he married Polish woman, Maria Zazulak (also a Siberian deportee) in 1949. The couple created a life together in Titirangi where their two sons, Zbigniew and Stanislaw, were born. Boleslaw's photographs taken in New Zealand include images of his own family life, the Polish community in New Zealand, street scenes, and landscapes.

Boleslaw never returned to Poland and remained in New Zealand until his death in 1995.

In 2004 Boleslaw's Bialystok film negatives were found hidden in an abandoned shed in Bialystok where his mother and sister had stored them after he was arrested and sent to Siberia. Polish photographer, curator, and caretaker of the Bolesław Augustis collection Grzegorz Dąbrowski, has been a key figure in the preservation, research and promotion of the collection. In 2023, the collection was added to by a donation of 600 photographs taken by Boleslaw in New Zealand to the Widok Cultural Education Association in Bialystok, Poland.

The Sleńdziński Gallery in Białystok has organised a series of exhibitions of Augustis' work including the exhibition Bolesław Augustis: Two Homelands / Dwie Ojczyzny, curated by Grzegorz Dąbrowski, part of the 2026 Auckland Festival of Photography.
