= Kurier Poranny =

Kurier Poranny (Polish, 'Morning Courier') may refer to one of the following Polish newspapers:

- Kurier Poranny (1877–1939)
- Kurier Poranny (modern)
