= Army Museum in Białystok =

- Muzeum Wojska w Białymstoku
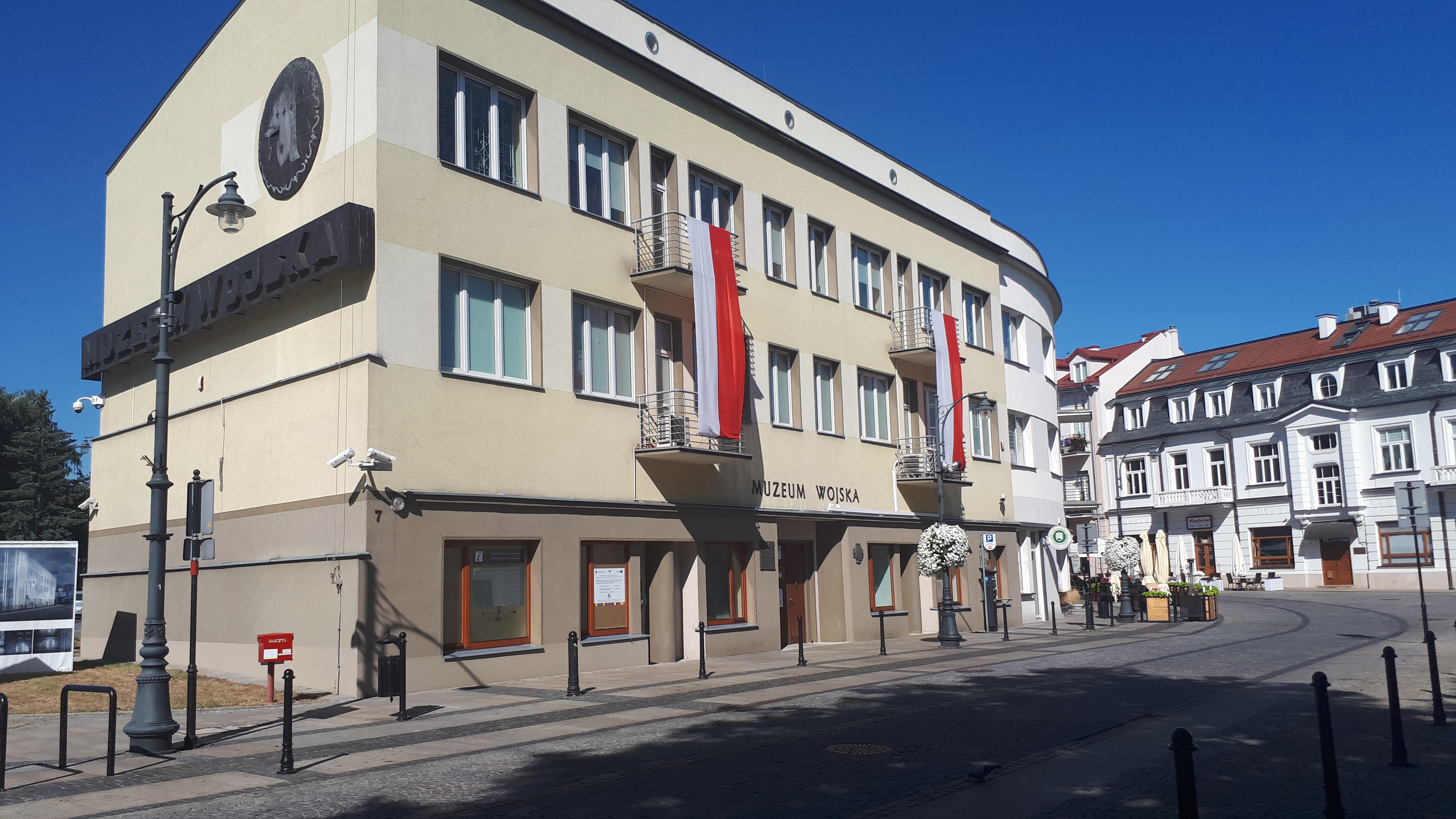
- Established: 1968
- Location: 7 Kilińskiego Street, Białystok
- Coordinates: 53°07′55″N 23°09′59″E
- Type: War museum
- Director: Robert Sadowski
- Website: mwb.com.pl/mwb2017/

Army Museum in Białystok (Polish: Muzeum Wojska w Białymstoku) is a military museum in Białystok in Podlaskie Voivodeship in north-eastern Poland. It is the largest army museum in the region. First opened in 1968, since 1976 it has been operating as an independent museum unit with a macro-regional range. It is currently a self-governing cultural institution of the city of Białystok. Until the end of 2016 the Siberian Memorial Museum existed as a branch of the Army Museum..

== History ==
The museum was established in September 1968 as a branch of the District Museum (now the Podlaskie Museum in Białystok). It was the result of many years of research and the collective passion of a large group of people in love with the military past of the Białystok region and the society of the Białystok region, wishing to document the armed struggles of their ancestors, from the beginning of the Polish state through the period of independence fights after the end of World War II in the years 1945–1956. The original seat of the museum was the Guest Palace. It soon turned out that the building could no longer contain any further exhibits. In 1974, the museum was moved to 7 Kilińskiego Street, its current location. In 1976, it was granted the status of an autonomous macro-regional museum. The organizer and long-time director of the museum was Colonel Dr. Zygmunt Kosztła. Using the contacts established during earlier military service, he quickly gathered a collection of exhibits, which are still the basis of the collection owned by the museum. He also began research on the military history of the Białystok region. In 1980, a project was created to establish a research center by establishing a Military History Research Center in Białystok conducting scientific research and publishing activities.

In 2010, the director of the museum changed. The current prof. Dr. hab. Krzysztof Filipów was replaced by Robert Sadowski, MA. He began to change the exhibition and nature of the museum's activities. In 2010, the Siberia Memorial Museum began to be organized as a branch of the existing institution.

In 2018 one of investments from Citizens Budget was building the Military Park at 3 Węglowa Street. It was opened during the Museum Night, on 14th May 2022.

At present a new seat of the museum is under construction, at 7 Węglowa Street, with the opening planned for 2028.

== Permanent exhibitions ==
=== "Against two enemies. Military history of Podlasie and its inhabitants in 1939-1956" ===
This exhibition presents the Podlasie episodes of World War II.

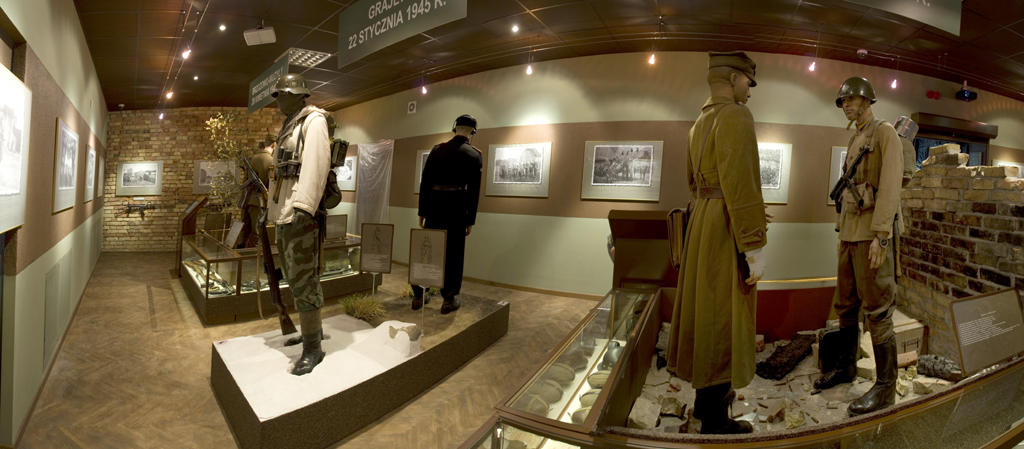

September 1939 - the first diorama is a life-size slice of a Polish trench from the September campaign. It presents the defense of the Lomza 33rd infantry regiment near Nowogród on 8–10 September;

- Two enemies - some dioramas are dedicated to army soldiers occupying the Podlasie region. Among them you can find a Red Army soldier from the troops entering Białystok in 1939, and a second lieutenant in the Wehrmacht from Operation Barbarossa;
- Battle of Monte Cassino - many soldiers fighting in this battle came from the north-eastern borderlands of the Second Polish Republic. Among them was Ryszard Kaczorowski, the last president of the Republic of Poland born in exile. Diorama presents the operation of the Bren machine gun in position, built of authentic stones brought from the battlefield;

Eastern Front 1944-1945 - in the summer of 1944, the front passed through Białystok for the third time during this war. The German 12th Armored Division took part in the city fights. Another mannequin presents a grenadier from the 286th Infantry Division in winter uniform during fights on the Narew line;

Lusatia 1945 - another diorama presents the 9th Dresden Infantry Division, organized in Białystok, which took part in the Battle of Bautzen (1945), one of the bloodiest battles in which the Polish Army fought during the war,

Independence underground - the last diorama presents an episode of World War II history so far absent from the exhibition at the Army Museum, namely the post-war independence underground. The exhibition combines traditional forms of presentation as well as interactive and multimedia elements. Professionally arranged dioramas appeal to the imagination of visitors. The radio plays contain accounts of participants in war events, while they are read by well-known Polish actors. Special glasses allow to view photos in three dimensions. Numerous info kiosks contain exhibit descriptions, historical information, accounts, memories and multimedia.

=== "Polish Army 1956-2010" ===
The exhibition shows the evolution of the uniforms and equipment of the Polish Army in the second half of the twentieth century. The exhibition consists of mannequins in full uniforms, equipment and armament including NATO combat missions and UN peacekeeping missions. The arrangements were inspired by units stationed in Białystok:

- 2nd Podlasie Communications Regiment of the Internal Defense Forces,
- 25th Communications Regiment, Grouping of MON Defense Units,
- 18 Białystok Mechanized Brigade named after Marshal Edward Rydz-Śmigły,
- 18 reconnaissance regiment.

In addition, units stationed in the cities of the north-eastern region of Poland: Ełk, Zambrów and Ciechanów are presented. The Polish Army exhibition 1956-2010 was arranged for the scenery of a military warehouse with concrete walls with visible formwork imprints and cable bundles. The showcases were made of old military storage boxes of various sizes.

== Gallery ==
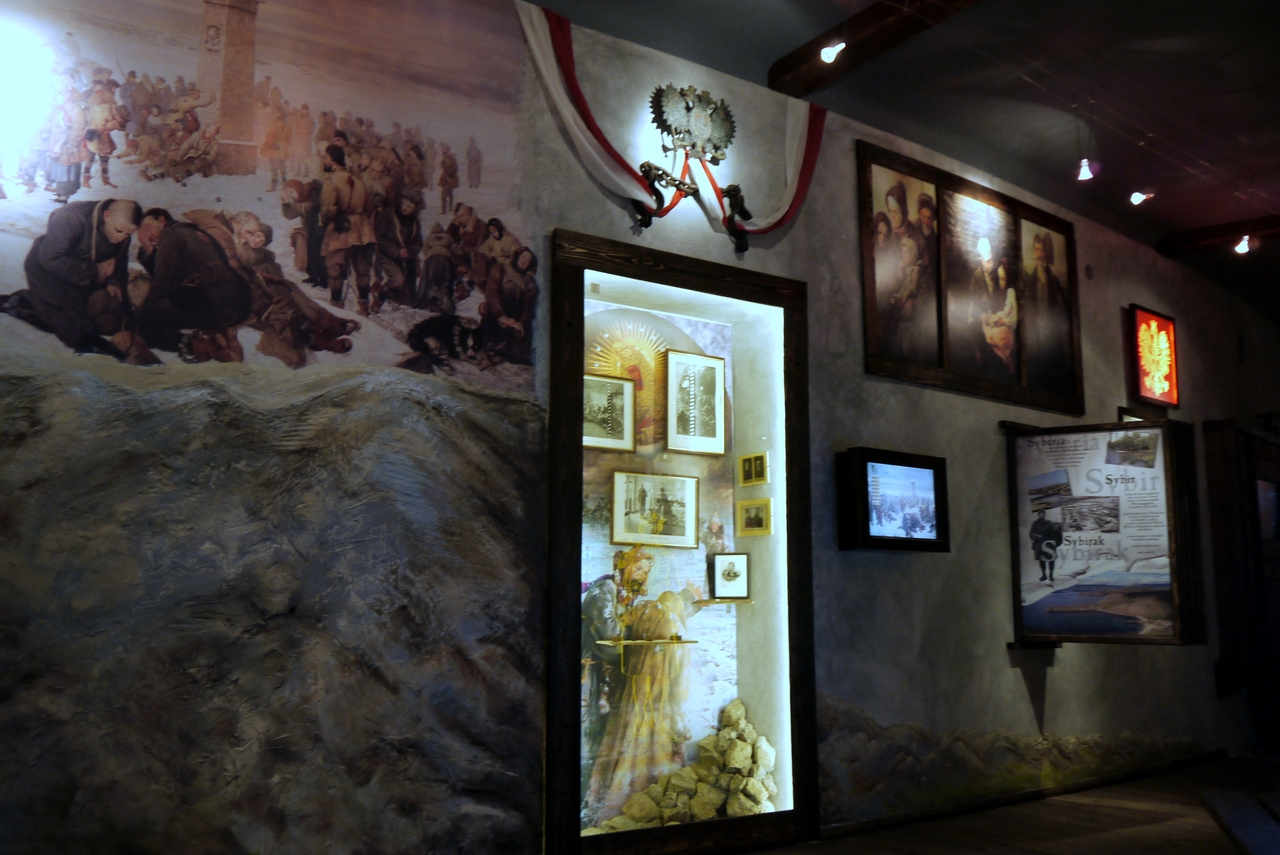
The exhibition shows the fate of Poles exiled to Siberia by the Russians over the centuries.

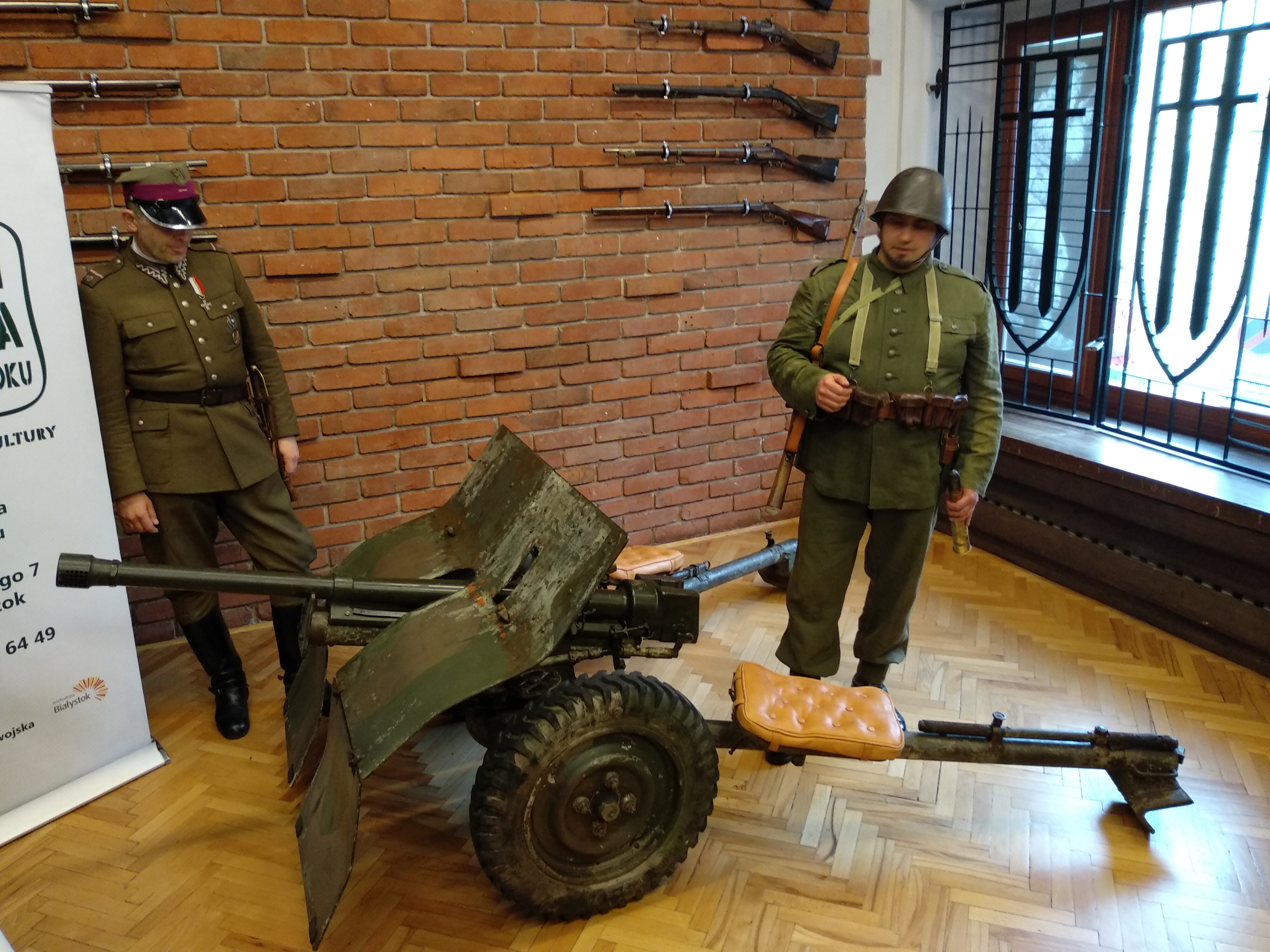
Bofors 37 mm anti-tank gun

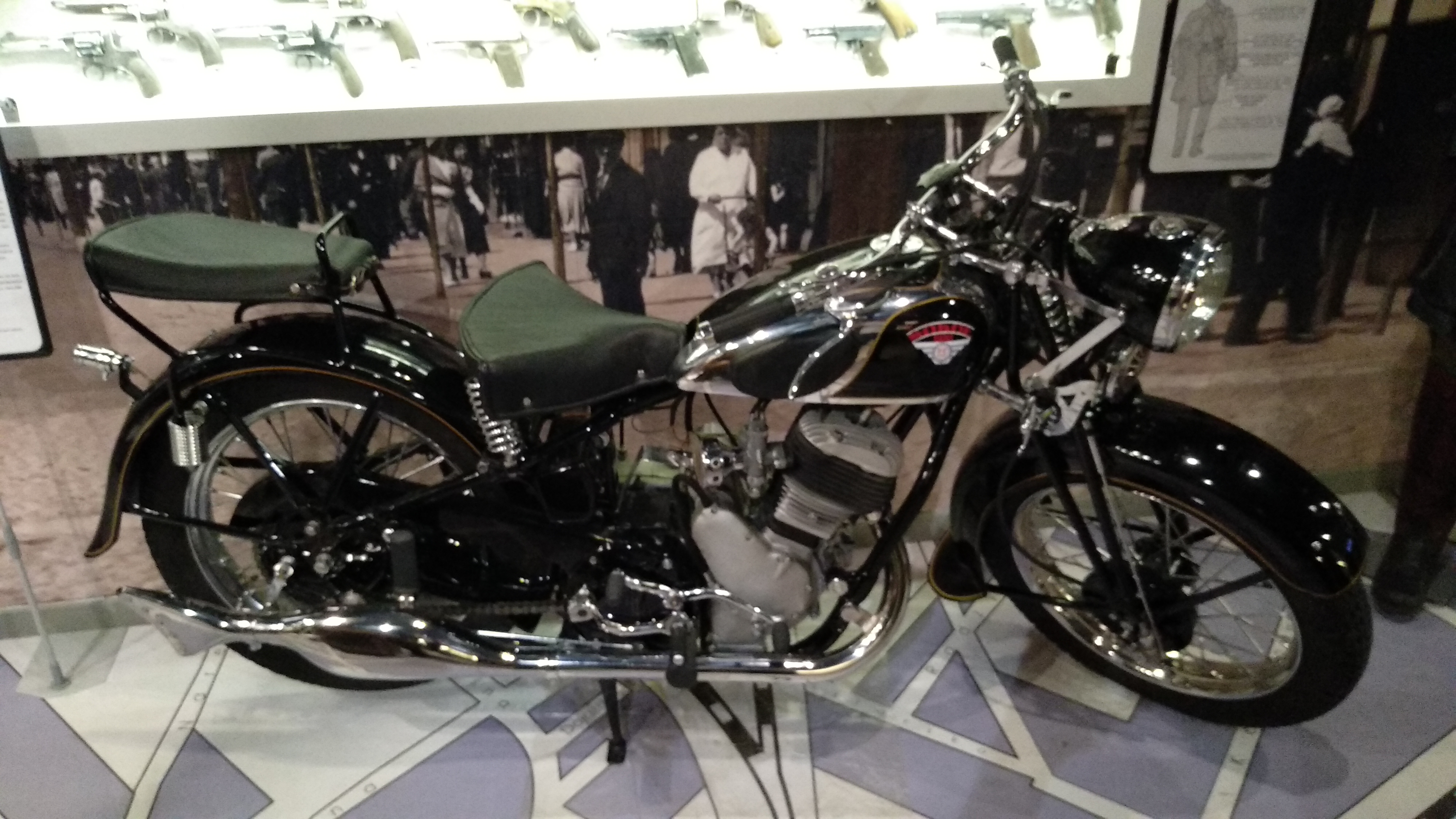
Sokół 600

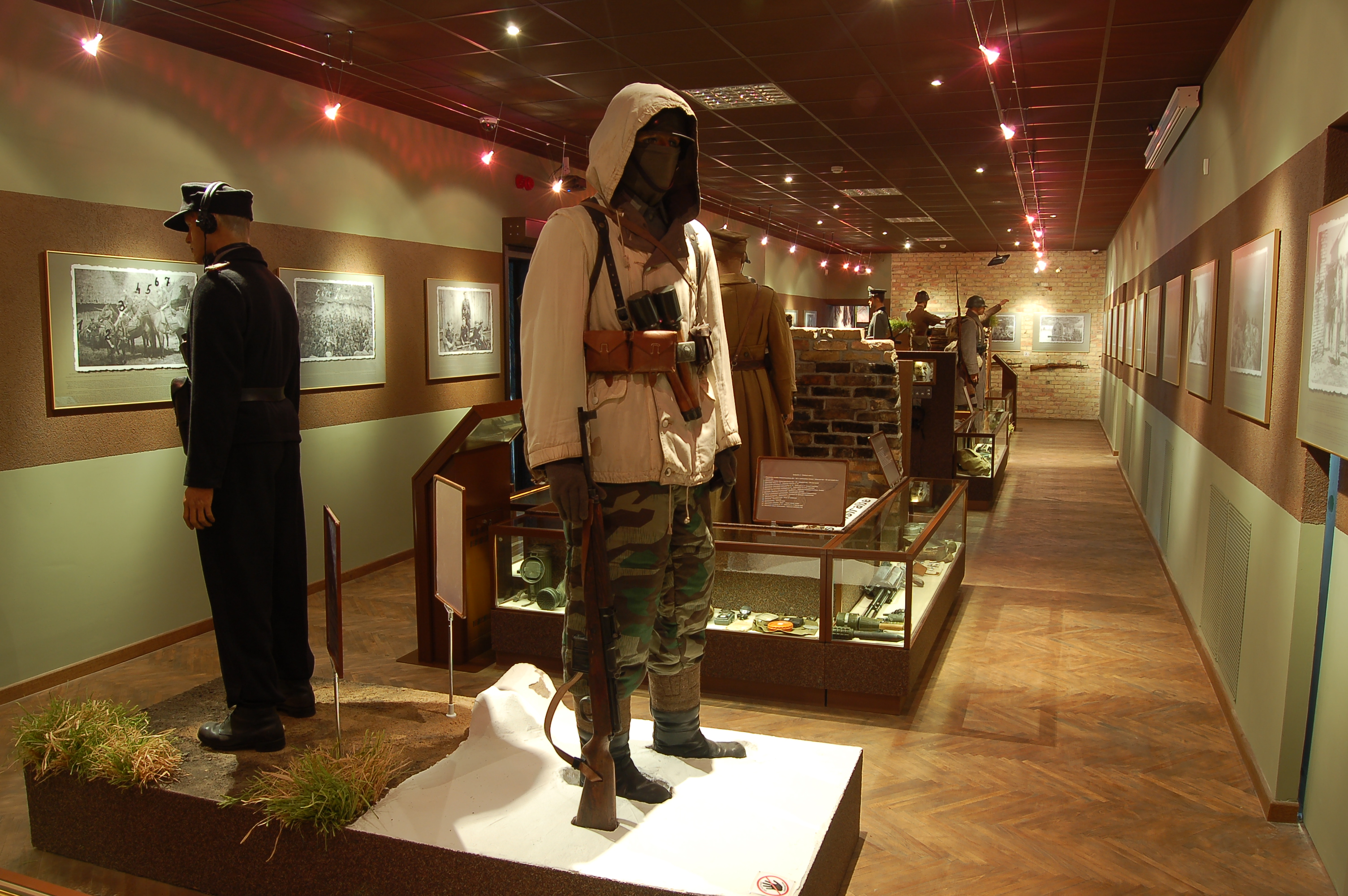
"Two enemies" - some dioramas are dedicated to army soldiers occupying the Podlasie region.

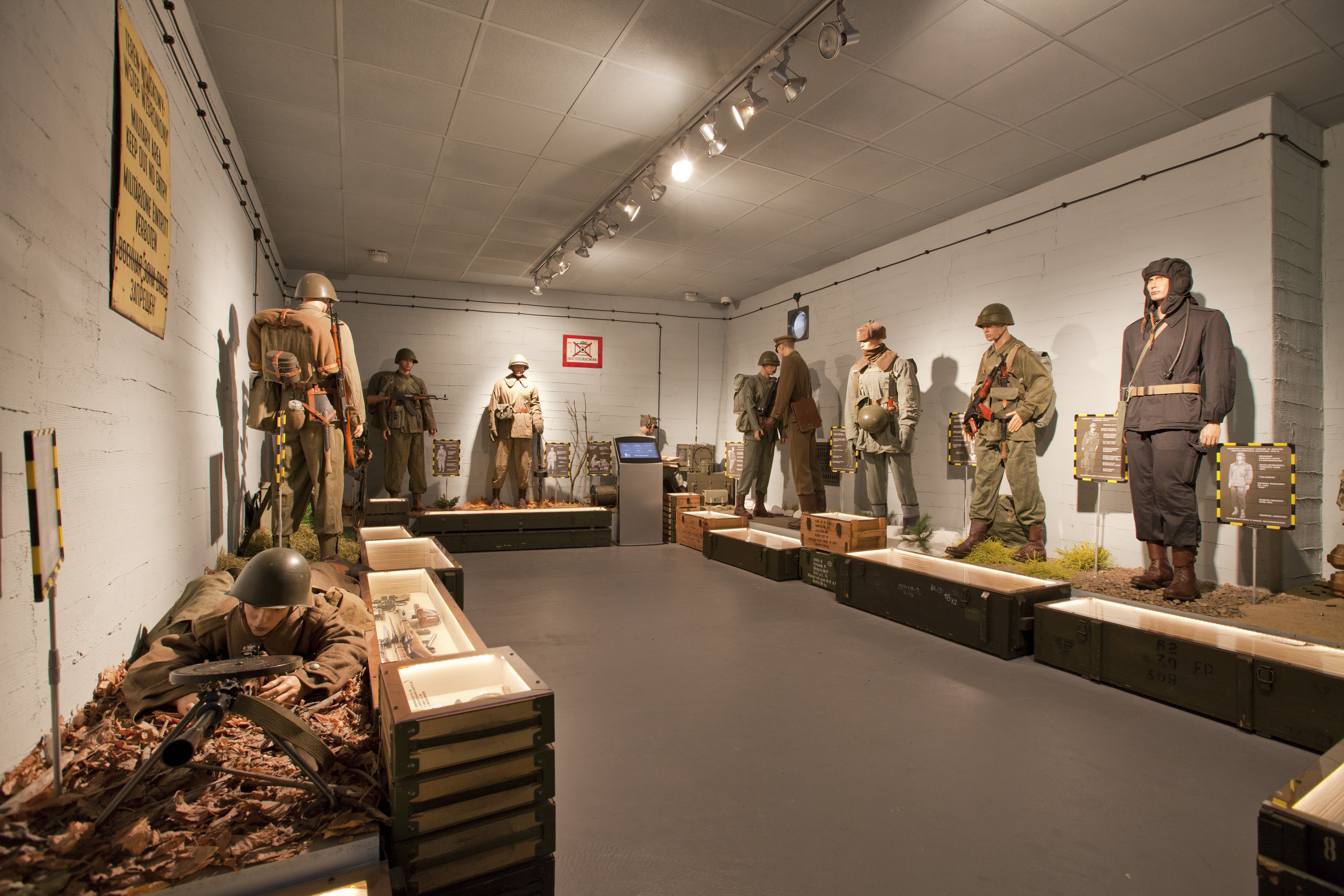
"Polish Army 1956-2010"

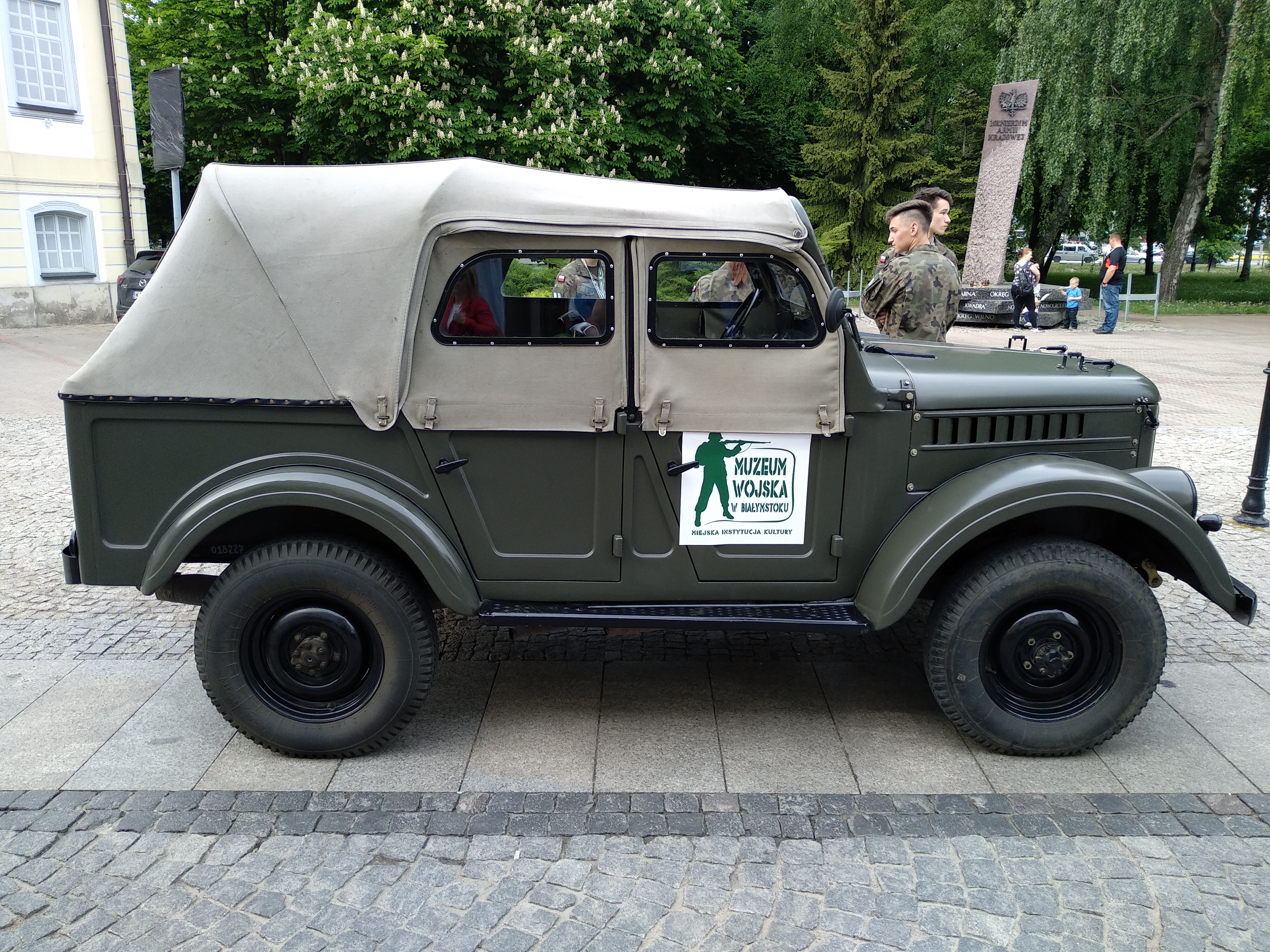
GAZ-69
