= Krzysztof Kononowicz =

Polish political and local government activist (1963–2025)

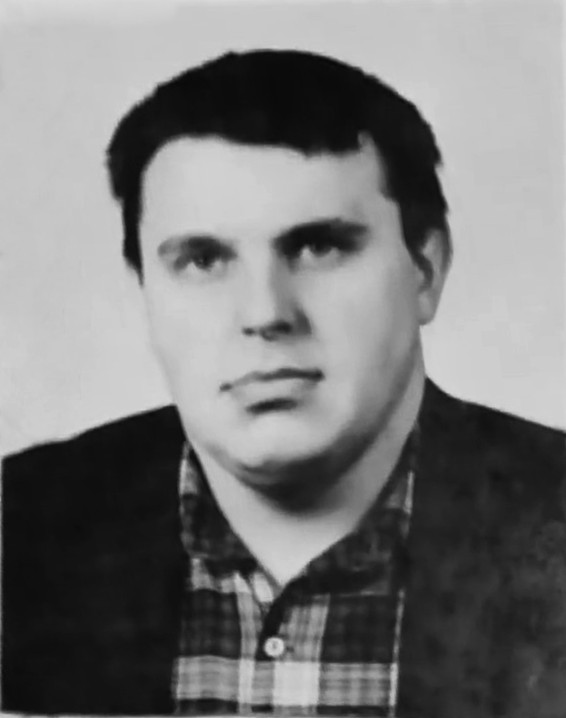
- Kononowicz in 2000
- Born: 21 January 1963; Kętrzyn, Poland
- Died: 6 March 2025 (aged 62); Białystok, Poland
- Occupations: Driver, political and local government activist, videoblogger
- Known for: Political activism, videoblogging

Krzysztof Kononowicz (21 January 1963 – 6 March 2025) was a Polish political and local government activist, local activist and vlogger.

In 2006, he ran for the office of mayor of Białystok and for the Białystok city council. He became widely popular after the publication of his speech in the election studio of TV Jard on YouTube. Some foreign websites and media have reported about him as an internet meme.

== Biography ==
Kononowicz came from a family with roots in the Kresy Wschodnie. He was born in Kętrzyn as the son of Bronisław (8 May 1908 or 1918 – 5 October 2004) and Leonarda (née Bykowicz; 6 November 1930 – 1 September 2012). He had two brothers: Bogumił (1959 or 1960 – 21 January 2013) and Marian (born and died around 1962).

His father was a prisoner in the Gulag between 1949 and 1954. He married and lived with his wife in the town of Strzelce (where he was born) in the Belarusian SSR. The Kononowicz family came to Poland in 1958 during the Repatriation of Poles. They settled in Masuria, in the village of Wilkowo. In 1975, they moved to Białystok.

In Białystok, Kononowicz completed primary school and vocational school as a driver-mechanic. He then did his compulsory military service, and later took care of his parents' household. In 1980, he joined the "Solidarity" trade union in Białystok, but in 2002 he resigned from membership in the union.

Since 1994, he was unemployed. Previously, he had worked as a driver at Trans Mlecz, cleaned at the Białystok City Office, and was also employed as a bus driver at the now-defunct MPK Białystok. He wanted to run for the position of mayor of Białystok in the 2002 local elections, but he registered too late for the candidates' registration. He also sought to become the head of the police in Białystok.

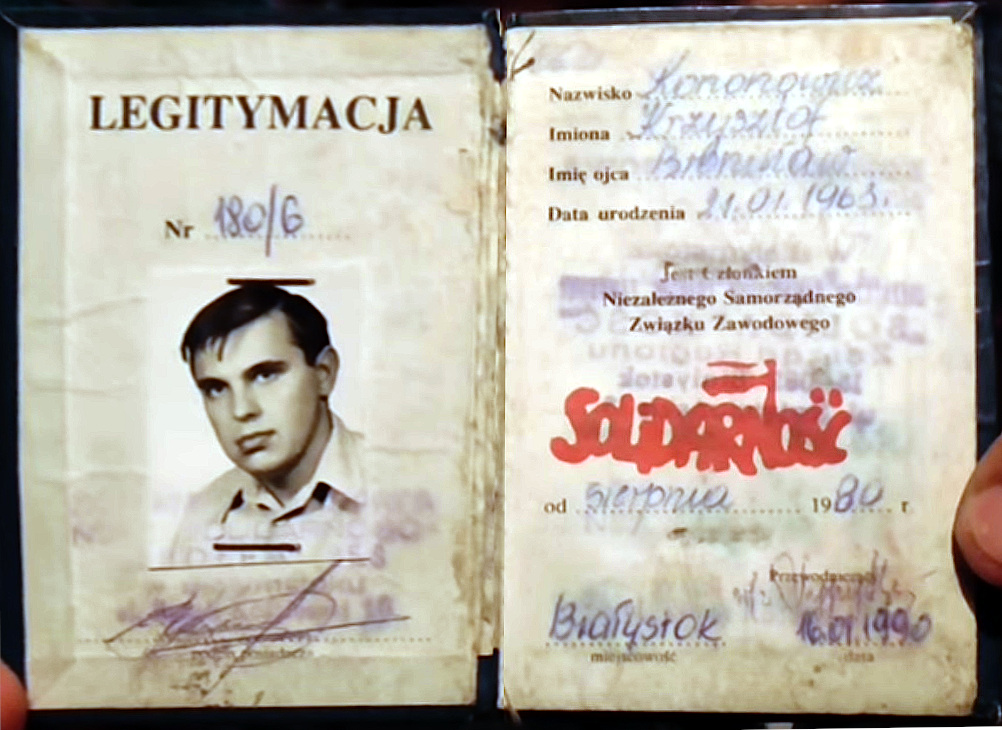
Kononowicz's Solidarity ID card

In the 2006 local elections, he ran from the Komitet Wyborczy Wyborców Podlasie XXI wieku (Electoral Committee of Podlasie of the 21st Century) list for the office of mayor of Białystok. He received 1,676 votes (1.89%) and came 6th among all 7 candidates and for the Białystok city council from electoral district number 4 (received 102 votes). His press spokesman during the election campaign was local social activist Adam Czeczetkowicz.

Election results
| Election | Electoral committee | Body | District | Result |
|---|---|---|---|---|
| 2006 | KWW Podlasie XXI Wieku | Mayor of the City of Białystok | – | No |
| 2006 | KWW Podlasie XXI Wieku | Białystok City Council | no. 3 | No |
| 2007 | KWW Podlasie XXI Wieku | Podlaskie Voivodeship Assembly 3rd Term | no. 1 | No |

He became more widely known after the publication of his speech from the TV Jard Election Studio on YouTube. Fragments were also shown by the main news services of the largest television stations, including Fakty TVN, Wydarzenia, Wiadomości, and Teleexpress. This was also reported by web portals: Onet.pl, Interia.pl, Gazeta.pl. Numerous statements by Kononowicz began to gain popularity, such as:

(...) Żeby nie było bandyctwa, żeby nie było złodziejstwa, żeby nie było niczego. [So that there would be no banditry, so that there would be no thievery, so that there would be nothing.]

or

(...) nie będzie biurokractwa, nie będzie łachmaństwa (...) [there will be no bureaucracy, there will be no ragamuffinism]

Some foreign media reports included the Der Spiegel and The Sydney Morning Herald. After the elections, Kononowicz notified the court about the violation of the election silence, which was allegedly committed by the parish priest of the Parish of the Resurrection of the Lord in Białystok.

In 2006, he established the Citizen Intervention Office, a social organization operating in Białystok.

The daily newspaper "Rzeczpospolita" revealed that behind the media creation and persuading Kononowicz to run in the elections were Adam Czeczetkowicz, who was his spokesman, and historian Marek Czarniawski. Both were members and activists of the Polish National Party, and Kononowicz's candidacy was intended to promote the electoral committee they created.

On 20 May 2007, he participated in the repeated elections to the Podlaskie Voivodeship Sejmik, where he ran again from the first place on the list of "KWW Podlasie XXI wieku" in electoral district no. 1. He received 295 votes. During the 2007 parliamentary election, he was a member of the Białystok electoral commission number 101. The KWW Podlasie XXI wieku itself did not collect enough signatures to run in the elections.

In 2008, he announced his intention to run for the presidency of the Polish Football Association. In the spring of 2009, he intended to run in the European Parliament elections from the list of the Slavic Union party. The electoral committee ultimately failed to field any lists. At the beginning of 2010, he made an unsuccessful attempt to run for the office of President of Poland. However, the organizers of his campaign did not decide to submit signatures to the National Electoral Commission, and the electoral committee was not registered at all.

At the end of 2010, due to his poor financial situation, he made an appeal for financial help, which quickly met with a spontaneous reaction from internet users. In a few days 5,859 PLN was collected. It turned out that the collection was carried out illegally. The money was eventually delivered to Kononowicz.

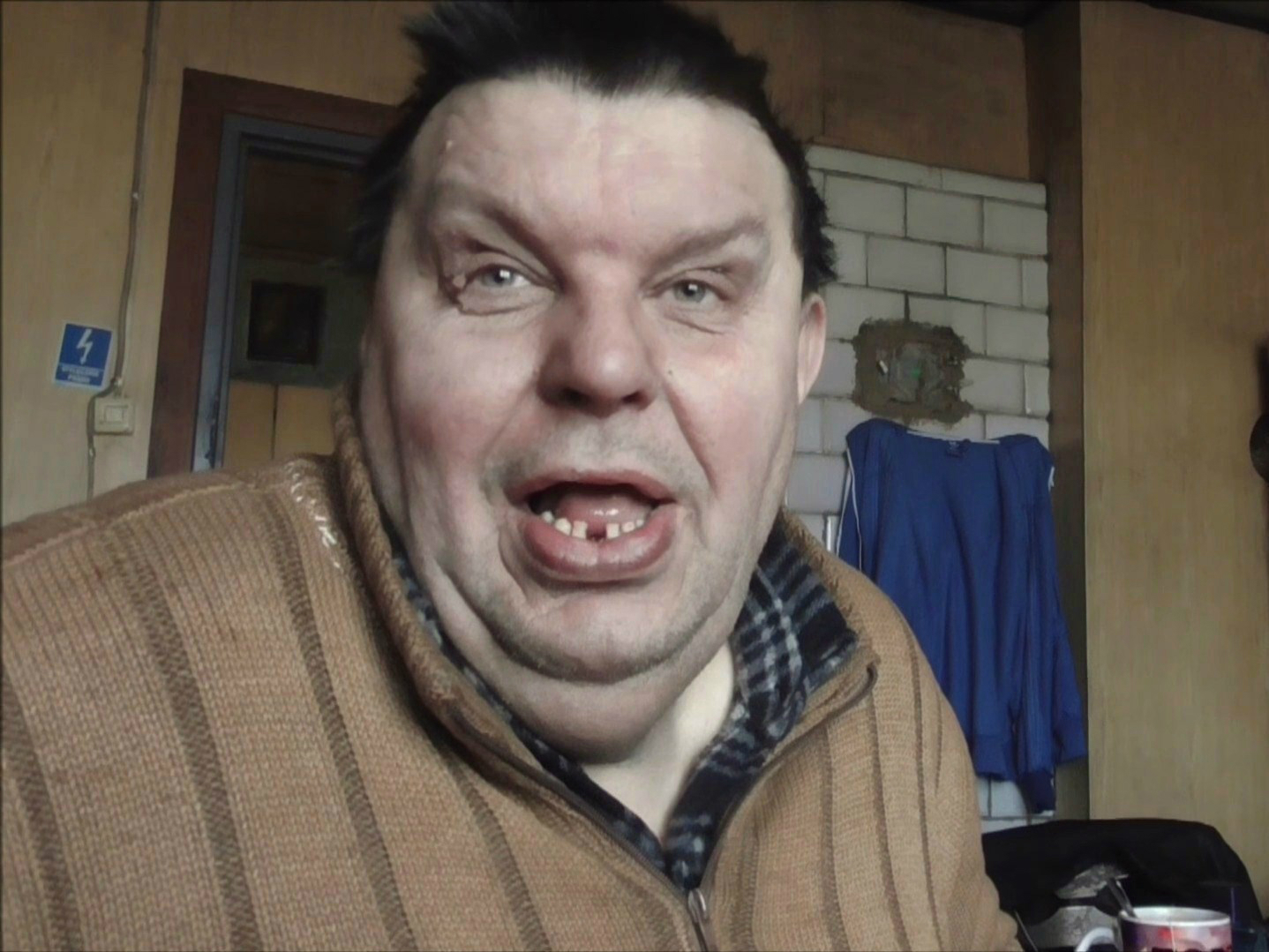
Kononowicz in 2017

From 2015, videos recorded with Kononowicz again began to become popular on YouTube. The videos were characterized by an amateur recording method and absurd, controversial topics. Over time, the collection of videos depicting the life of Kononowicz, roommates, friends, carers, video recorders and editors, began to be referred to as the "Uniwersum Szkolna 17" ["Szkolna 17 Universe"], since Kononowicz's address was "ul. Szkolna 17".

At the start of January 2020, Kononowicz's YouTube channel reached over 100,000 subscribers, and the videos were viewed over 26 million times. Kononowicz's videos were given as an example of the phenomenon of patostream ["pathological stream"], due to the presentation of alcohol drinking sessions or vulgar arguments between Kononowicz and his roommate Wojciech "Major" Suchodolski (died 2023).

In April 2020, he was reported in the national media after he publicly stated that the SARS-CoV-2 virus does not exist, and encouraged breaking the regulations introduced in connection with the COVID-19 pandemic in Poland.

Kononowicz died in Białystok on 6 March 2025, at the age of 62.

== Controversies ==
In 2022, Kononowicz was the subject of an episode of the program Sprawa dla reportera, hosted by Elżbieta Jaworowicz. The Commissioner for Human Rights, Marcin Wiącek, intervened with the National Broadcasting Council regarding the broadcast of the episode showing Kononowicz's case, as he considered that the content of the recordings presented in the program "often has a vulgar, violent, and above all, dignity-violating character for this person." The National Broadcasting Council initiated an investigation.

The care for Kononowicz by the team of the Mleczny Człowiek channel (on which recordings featuring Kononowicz were published) became the subject of controversy. Kononowicz's self-appointed caretakers were accused of, among other things, financially exploiting the subject of the materials, humiliating him, and surveillance. During this time, Kononowicz's health condition and mobility significantly deteriorated. In 2024, the end of the channel's activity was announced, but it did not come to fruition.

At the end of December 2024, Kononowicz was hospitalized and subsequently placed in an induced coma. In February 2025, he was placed in a hospice. On 6 March 2025, unconfirmed information about his death appeared, which was reported by, among others, Polish political activist Zbigniew Stonoga. On the same day, the information about Kononowicz's death was confirmed by the press spokeswoman for the mayor of Białystok, Urszula Boublej.

== Assaults ==
- In September 2015, he was attacked and robbed in his own home, and also severely beaten. In June 2016, the District Court in Białystok sentenced the attackers to imprisonment.
- On 9 December 2019, he was attacked and beaten in his own home by three men, who then robbed him.

== In media ==
Kononowicz appeared in "Ciacho" (2010) as a prosecutor In 2007, he appeared in a radio advertisement for the company Netia. He appeared in the music video for the song "Nie będzie niczego" (There will be nothing) by the hip-hop group Grupa Operacyjna (pl).
