= Krynice, Podlaskie Voivodeship =

Krynice
- Village
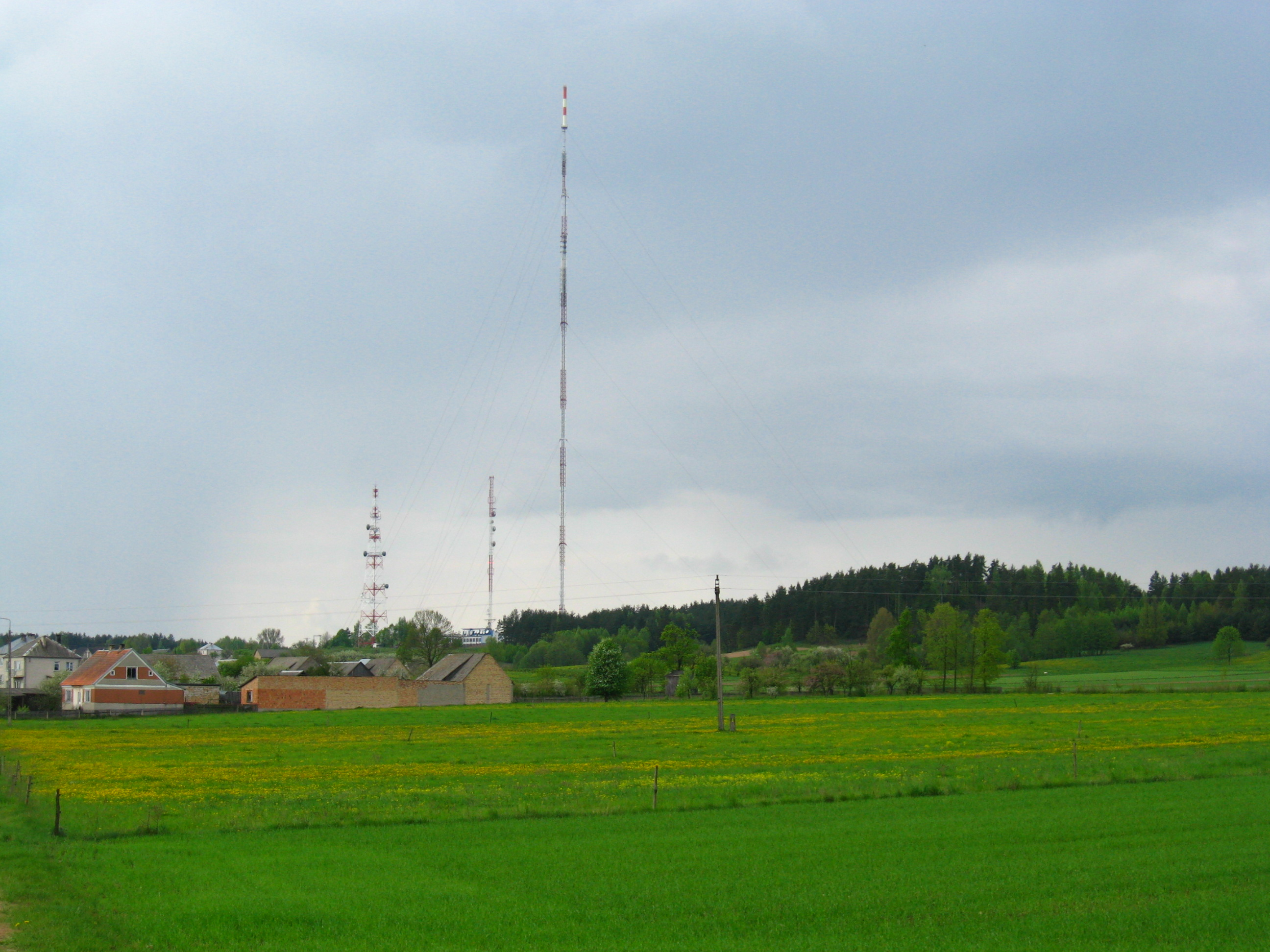
- view of the RTCN Białystok in the village

- Location within Poland
- Coordinates: 53°14′N 23°2′E
- Country: Poland
- Voivodeship: Podlaskie
- County: Białystok
- Gmina: Dobrzyniewo Duże
- Population: 320

Krynice [krɨˈnit͡sɛ] is a village in the administrative district of Gmina Dobrzyniewo Duże, within Białystok County, Podlaskie Voivodeship, in north-eastern Poland.

The village is the location of the RTCN Białystok (Krynice) mast, the seventh highest structure in Poland.
