= TV Jard =

Television channel in Bialystok, Poland, 2002–2018

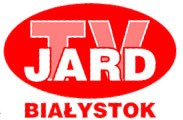
- Country: Poland

Programming
- Picture format: 16:9

Ownership
- Owner: JARD Media (Przedsiębiorstwo Wielobranżowe JARD)

History
- Launched: 22 June 2002
- Closed: 2018

Telewizja Jard or TV Jard (formerly Białostocka Telewizja Miejska – BTM for short) was a commercial television station in the city of Białystok, broadcasting on the Vectra cable network since 2002. It closed down in 2018. The head of this station was Jarosław Dziemian, owner of the JARD group of companies, that included two radio stations (one since 2018), the Turkus hotel and the Klub Rozrywki Krąg entertainment center.

== History ==
The station started broadcasting on June 22, 2002, under the name Białostocka Telewizja Miejska. Vectra subscribers were already informed days in advance, that the then-upcoming channel would broadcast on one of Vectra's channels, from 17:15 to 18:00. On June 15, subscribers saw a test broadcast. For this end, Vectra signed an agreement with production company Studio Intro to provide the service to subscribers in Białystok, after the company's successful run with Vectra's head-end in Suwałki. During the summer months, BTM would broadcast exclusively a new program on Saturdays which would be repeated in the same slot in the rest of the week. Studio Intro hired a team of four to cover current cultural and sporting events, as well as information from local government authorities. The plan for fall 2002 was to increase the number of weekly programs, from one to six. These would be broadcast in the usual early evening slot and later repeated in the following morning. BTM was purchased by JARD in 2004, and in July 2005, the channel was now broadcasting over the internet. The channel continued broadcasting under this name until June 2006. The station was taken off the air.

In August 2006, Dzieman, owner of the JARD Group, decided to issue a license to the National Broadcasting Council for the channel, renaming it TV Jard and subsequently resuming broadcasts under the new name later that month.

Until 2009, the recording (and editing) of TV Jard's content was made in the Turkus hotel, before being sent to the Vectra head-end at Washington Street in the afternoon. This changed in September of that year, when the channel was made available on Vectra's digital cable offer, with the fiber network being connected to the Turkus hotel. At the end of 2013, TV Jard was made available on other cable operators in the region, after a decade exclusive to Vectra, and nine years under the control of the JARD group. By 2016, it was made available in Hajnówka and Bielsk Podlaski.

For the tenth anniversary of its license in September 2016, TV Jard improved its programming. The line-up up until then was a one-hour block, which was upgraded to a three-hour block. The channel was also instrumental in disseminating disco polo music.

The channel shut down in 2018.

== Programming ==
In 2007, the channel's daily line-up featured a news bulletin, Wydarzenia, followed by a weather report. The news aired Monday through Friday, with a weekly recap broadcast on Saturday. Following the news, the programming block included reports covering local events, as well as two regular shows: Ludzie mówią (People Say) and Ale Gość! (What a Guest!), the latter being an Interview program.

== Internet notoriety ==
On November 6, 2006, a few months after the channel resumed under the name of TV Jard, the channel aired the TV Jard Election Studio (Studio Wyborcze TV Jard), which profiled candidates for the post of the president of the city of Białystok. An excerpt of the broadcast, profiling candidate Krzysztof Kononowicz quickly went viral, due to demand from viewers, the channel's website reposted the entire election program.

Furthermore, in the early 2010s, the channel received renewed international attention due to the hiring of a black man from Sierra Leone, Rogers Cole-Wilson, longtime resident of Białystok (who had previously worked at TVP3 Białystok), to do the weather reports. One such bulletin had surpassed 600,000 views by January 4, 2011.
