= Gazeta Współczesna =

Polish daily newspaper

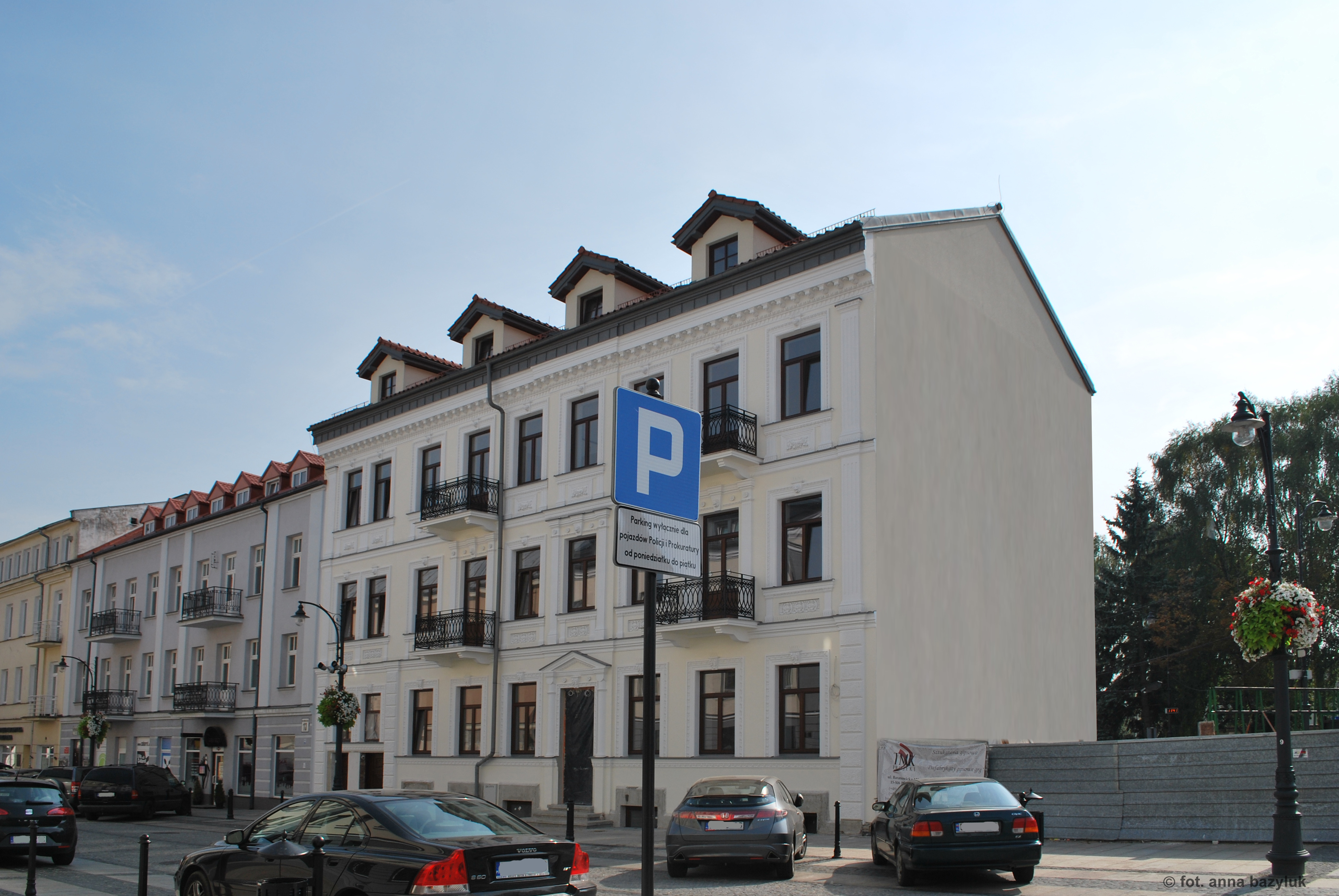
- Kamienica Jossema, the first headquarters of the newspaper
- Type: Daily newspaper
- Format: Broadsheet
- Owner: Polska Press
- Founded: 1951; 75 years ago
- Language: Polish
- Headquarters: Białystok, Poland
- ISSN: 0137-9488
- Website: wspolczesna.pl

Gazeta Współczesna is a Polish daily newspaper based in Białystok. It is owned by Polska Press.

== History ==
In 1950, the Central Committee of the Polish United Workers' Party wrote a letter to the provincial party committee in Białystok emphasizing the need for a party-backed newspaper to serve the Białystok Voivodeship. The first issue of the newspaper, then titled Gazeta Białostocka, was published on 1 September 1951. Stefan Pawlata served as the newspaper's first editor-in-chief, with Tadeusz Bazylko as his deputy. Its editorial board consisted of four journalists, all approved by the Central Committee. Its headquarters was located in Kamienica Jossema.

== Renaming ==
In 1975, following the partition of the Białystok Voivodeship, the newspaper's name was changed to Gazeta Współczesna. That year, its average circulation was over 125,000 copies.

Following the fall of the Polish United Workers' Party, Gazeta Współczesna was taken over by the Białystok Regional Board of Solidarity in 1991.
