= RTCN Białystok (Krynice) =

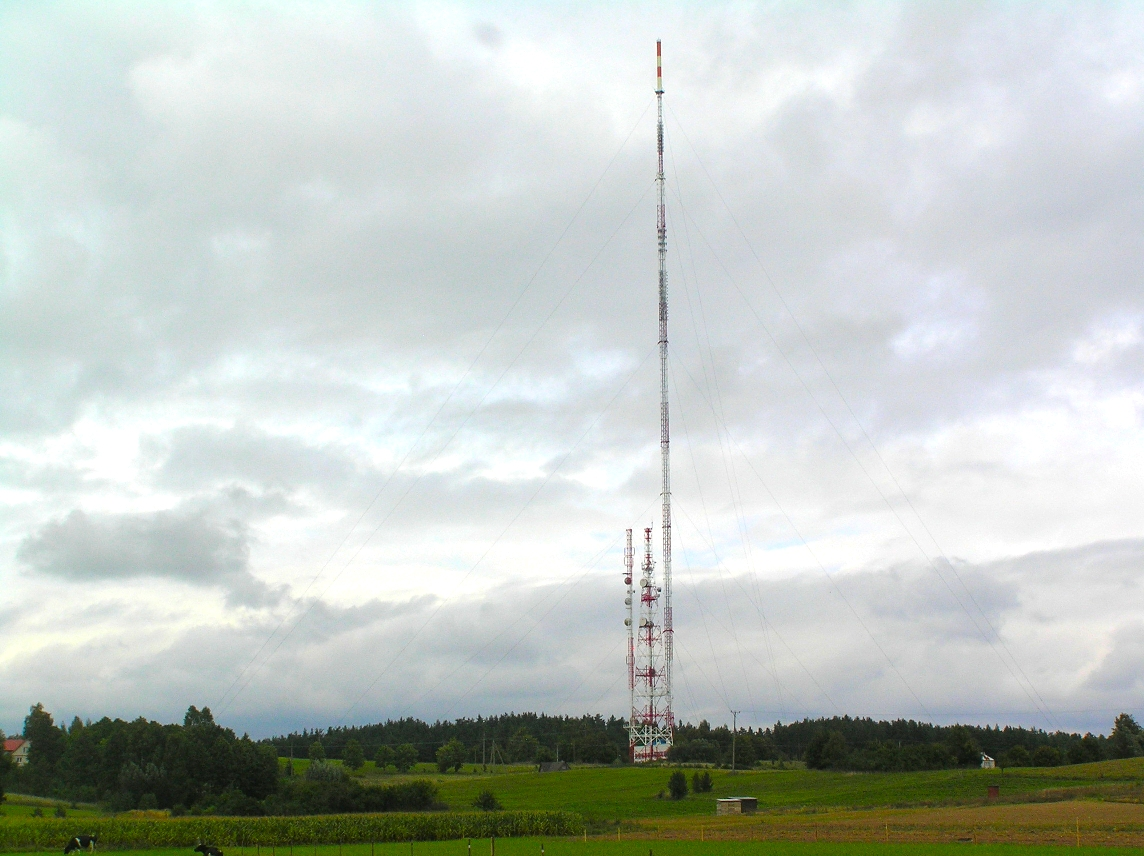
- RTCN Białystok (Krynice), currently Poland's seventh tallest structure

- Location within Poland

General information
- Status: Completed
- Type: TV-Mast
- Location: Krynice, Podlaskie Voivodeship, 16-002 Dobrzyniewo Kościelne, Poland
- Coordinates: 53°13′57″N 23°01′22″E
- Completed: Mast 1 - 1996; Mast 2 - 1962 (modified 1996)
- Owner: TP EmiTel

Height
- Height: 331 m (1,086 ft)

Design and construction
- Main contractor: Mostostal Zabrze, Katowice, PL

RTCN Białystok (Krynice) (Radio and Television Broadcasting Center; Polish: Radiowo-Telewizyjne Centrum Nadawcze, RTCN) is a 331 m (1,085.96 ft) tall guyed mast for FM and TV situated at Krynice near Białystok in Podlaskie Voivodeship, Poland. The structure was built in 1996 by Mostostal Zabrze, Katowice, PL and is the seventh tallest structure in Poland (since the collapse of the communist-built Warsaw radio mast). The mast is owned by TP EmiTel z o.o.

There is a second guyed mast at the same location which was manufactured by Mostostal Zabrze and erected by Białostockie Przedsiębiorstwo Budownictwa Miejskiego between April and September, 1962. It commenced regular broadcasting on 23 December 1962. It was originally 226 m (741.47 ft) tall, but its height was reduced in 1996 to 102 m (334.65 ft) after the erection of the neighboring 331 m (1,085.96 ft) mast.

== Major Transmitters ==
The licensed transmitters at this location are:

Type	Program	Frequency	Channel Number	Transmission Power	Transmitter Details
DVB-T TV	Multiplex 1	674 MHz	46	58 kW	
DVB-T TV	Multiplex 2	698 MHz	49	100 kW	
DVB-T TV	Multiplex 3	482 MHz	22	100 kW	
FM Radio	Polskie Radio Program I Polskie Radio S.A.	92,30 MHz		30 kW	Warel-Polska NRM 10S
FM Radio	Polskie Radio Program III; Polskie Radio S.A.	96 MHz		30 kW	Warel-Polska NRM 10S
FM Radio	Białoruskie Radio Racja; Białoruskie Centrum Informacyjne Sp. z o.o.	98,10 MHz		0,5 kW	R&S NR 8207
FM Radio	Polskie Radio Białystok; Regionalna Rozgłośnia w Białymstoku "Radio Białystok" S.A.	99,40 MHz		30 kW	Warel-Polska NRM 10S
FM Radio	RMF FM; Radio Muzyka Fakty Sp. z o.o.	100,20 MHz		120 kW	Itelco T 214
FM Radio	Radio Maryja; Warsaw Province of the Congregation of the Most Holy Redeemer	104,70 MHz		120 kW	RVR Elettronica VJ 15000
FM Radio	Radio ZET; Radio ZET Sp. z o.o.	107,30 MHz		120 kW	Warel-Polska NRM 10S

=== Antenna Configuration ===
- Circular antenna of type ADT 8015 at height of 313m, 16 floors high, on 4 sides, polarization horizontal, gain 15.46 dB, resistance 2.1 dB, transmitting at frequency of 479.25 MHz (TVP2).
- Circular antenna of type EAP 303 at height of 282.8m, 8 floors high, on 4 sides, polarization horizontal, gain 12 dB, resistance 2.1 dB, transmitting at frequency of 191.25 MHz (TVP1).
- Circular antenna of type ADB 4104 at height of 236 m, 4 floors high, on 6 sides, polarization vertical, gain 8.62 dB, resistance 1.02 dB, transmitting at frequency of 92.3 MHz (Polskie Radio Program I)
- Circular antenna of type ADB 4210 at height of 213 m, 8 floors high, on 3 sides, polarization horizontal, gain 9.39 dB, resistance 0.96 dB, transmitting at frequency of 100.2 MHz (RMF FM).

== Gallery ==
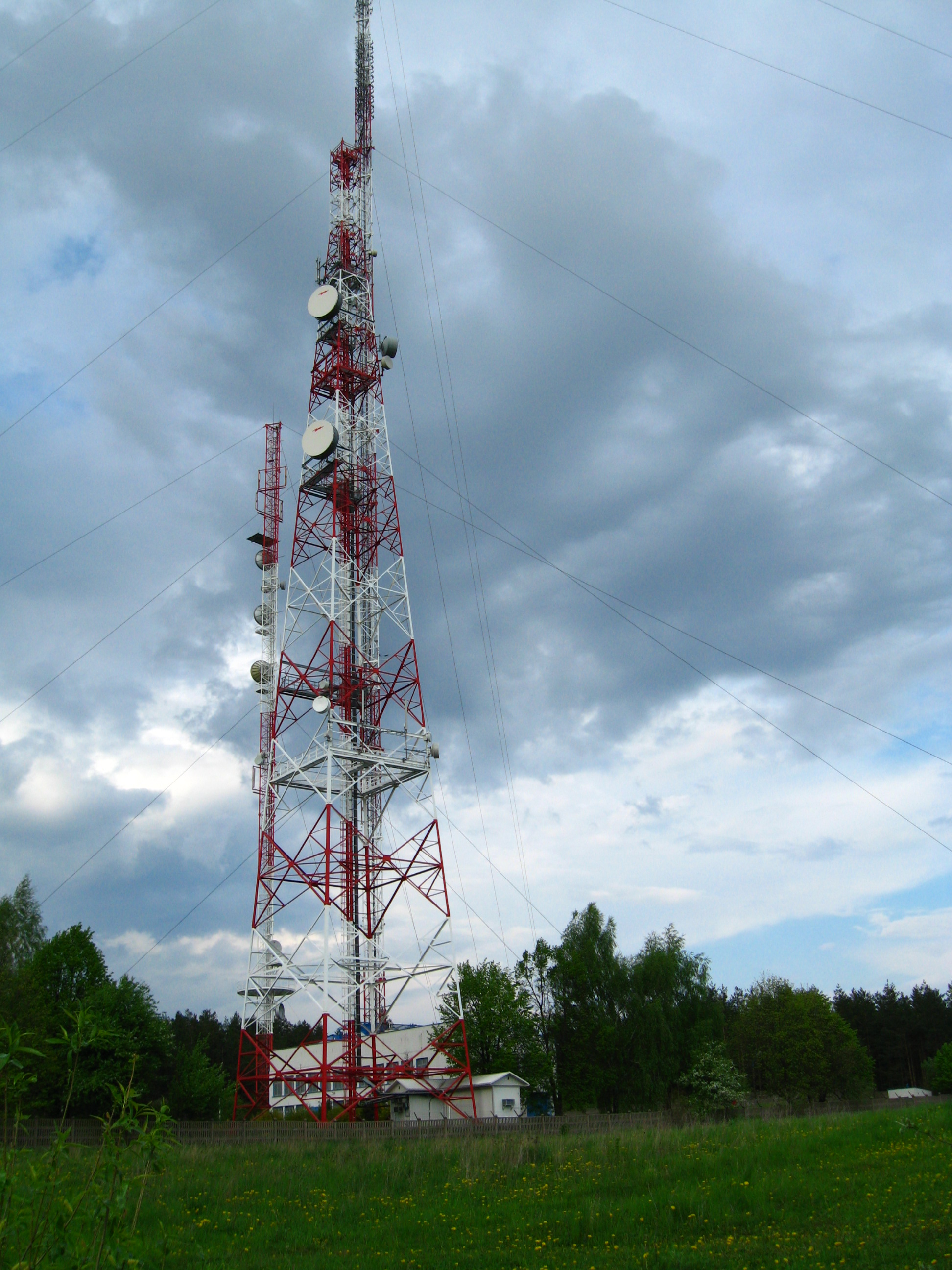
Lattice steel telecommunication tower; original mast (back, left); main mast (back, right)

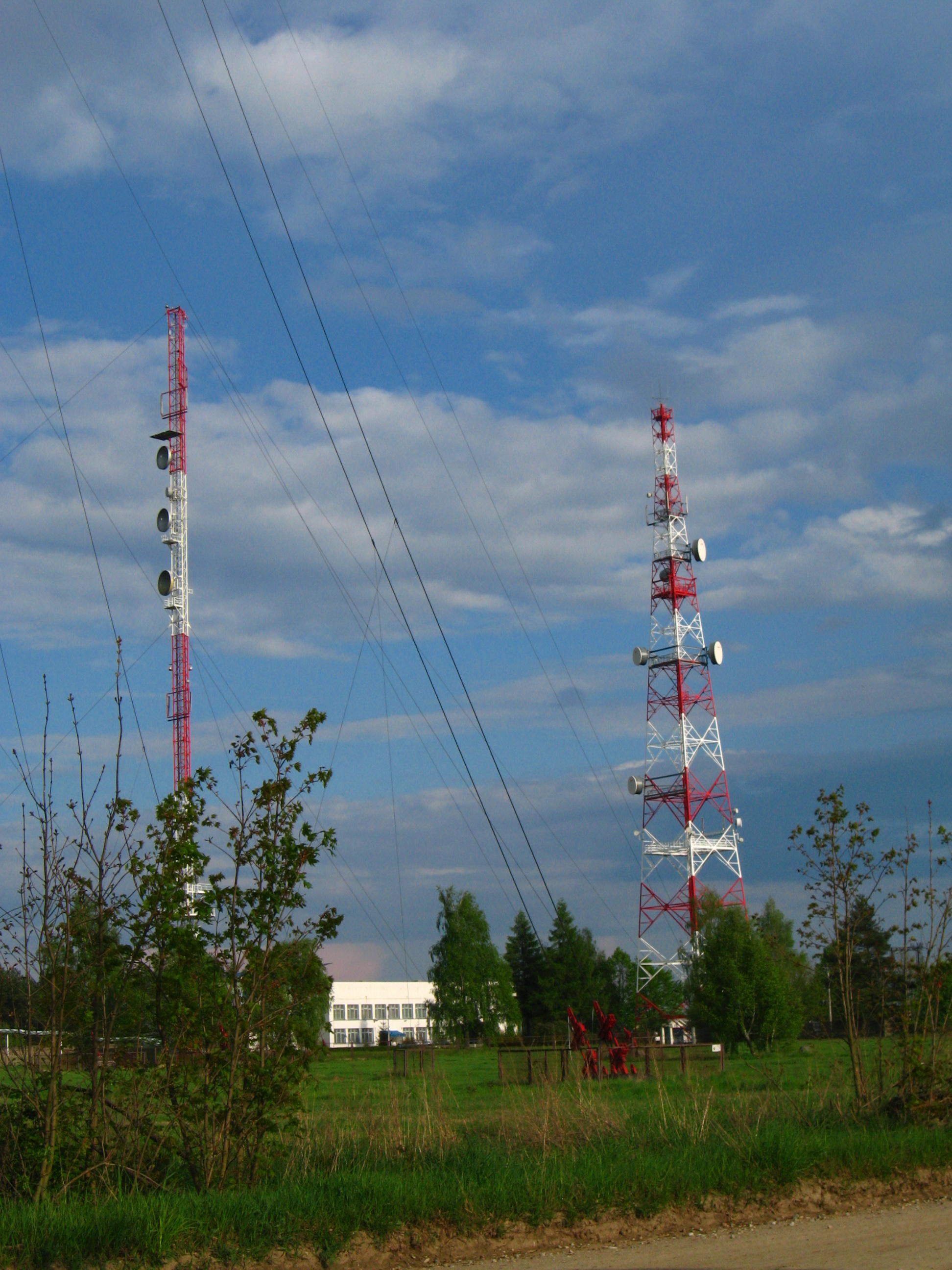
Lattice steel telecommunication tower (right); original mast (left)

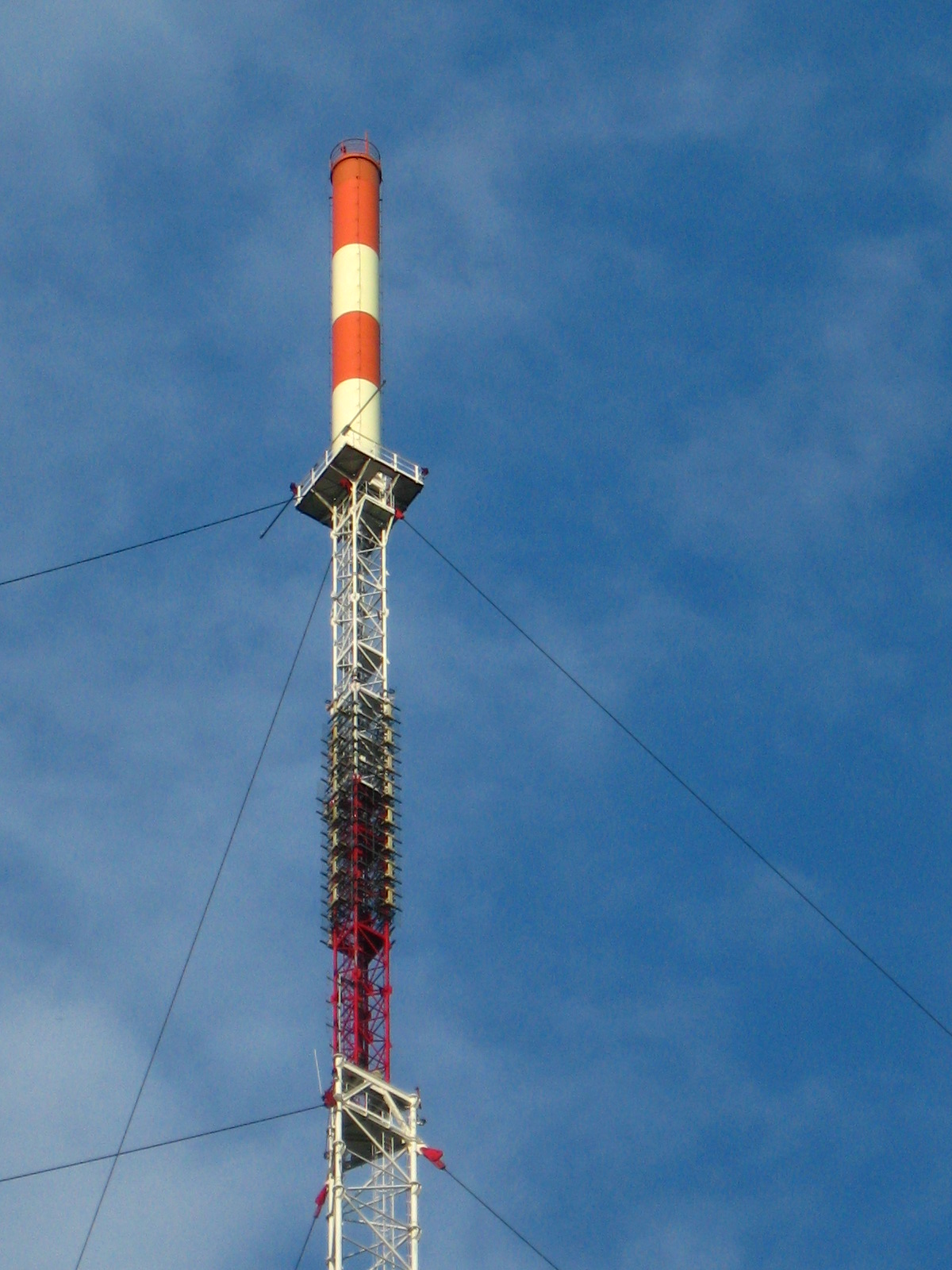
Main mast, top antenna is TVP2 at 313 m (1,026.90 ft); lower antenna is TVP1 at 282 m (925.20 ft)

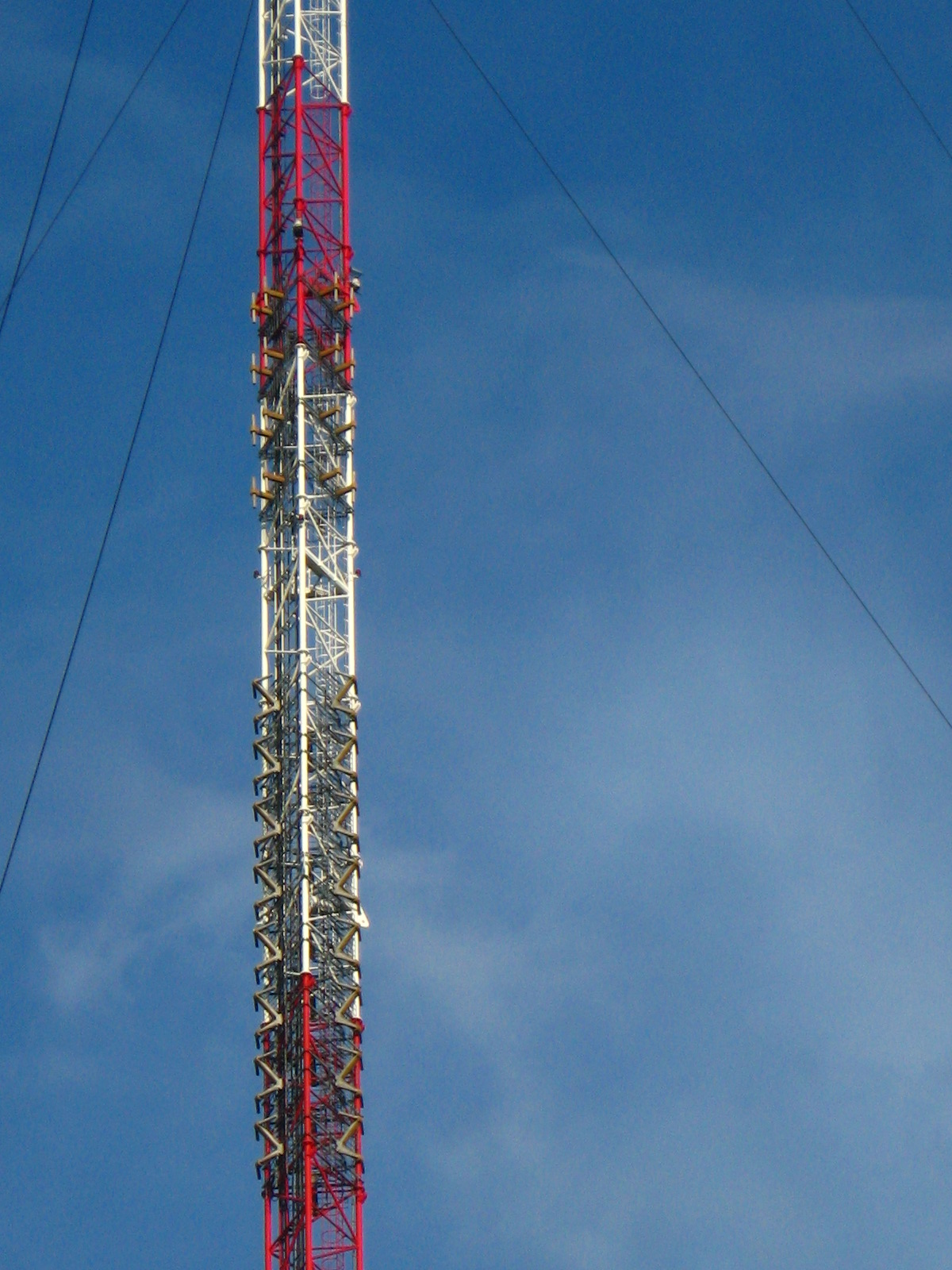
Main mast, Polskie Radio Program I antenna at 236 m (774.28 ft); RMF FM antenna at 213 m (698.82 ft)

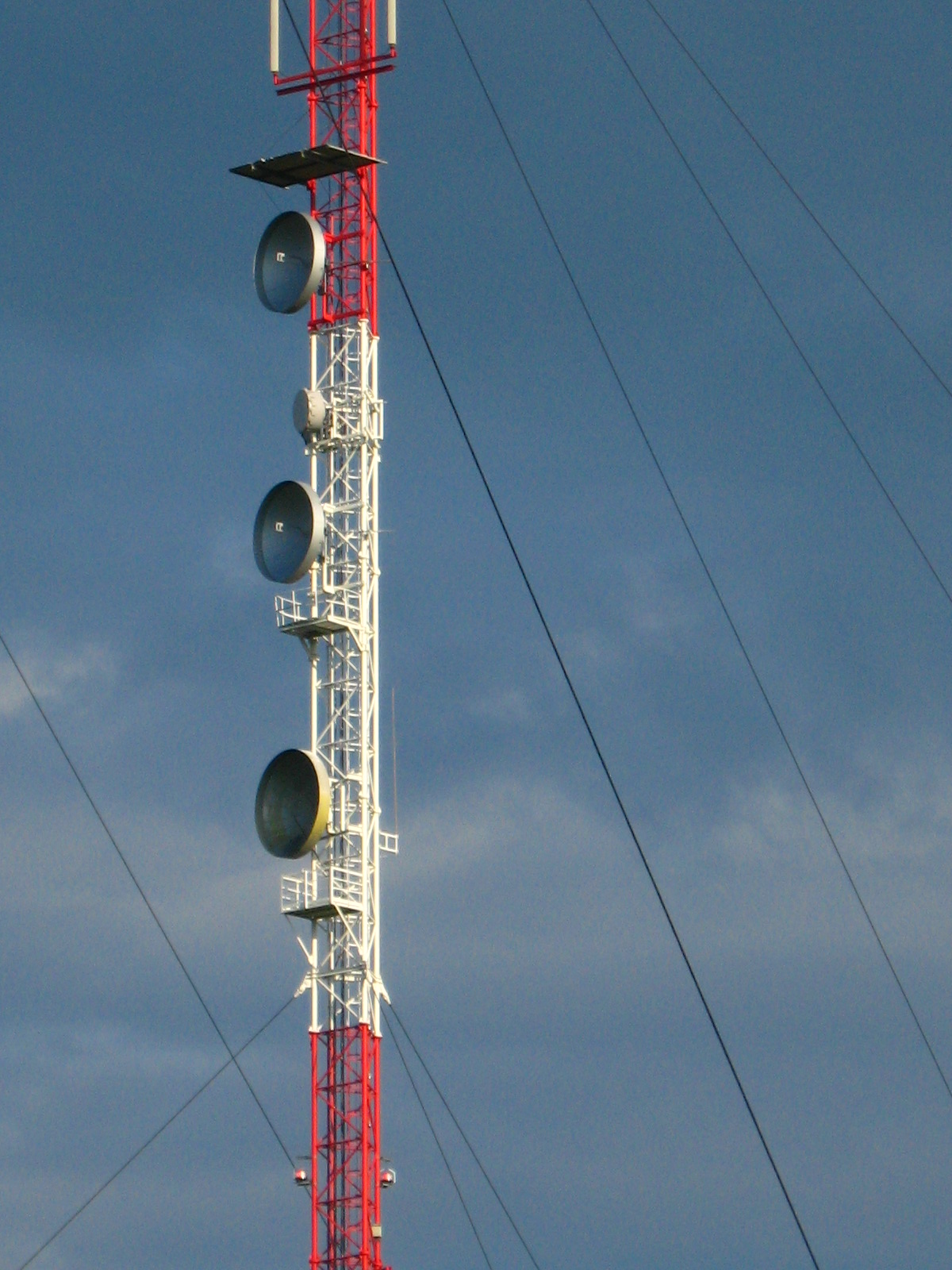
Microwave radio relay antennas on the original mast

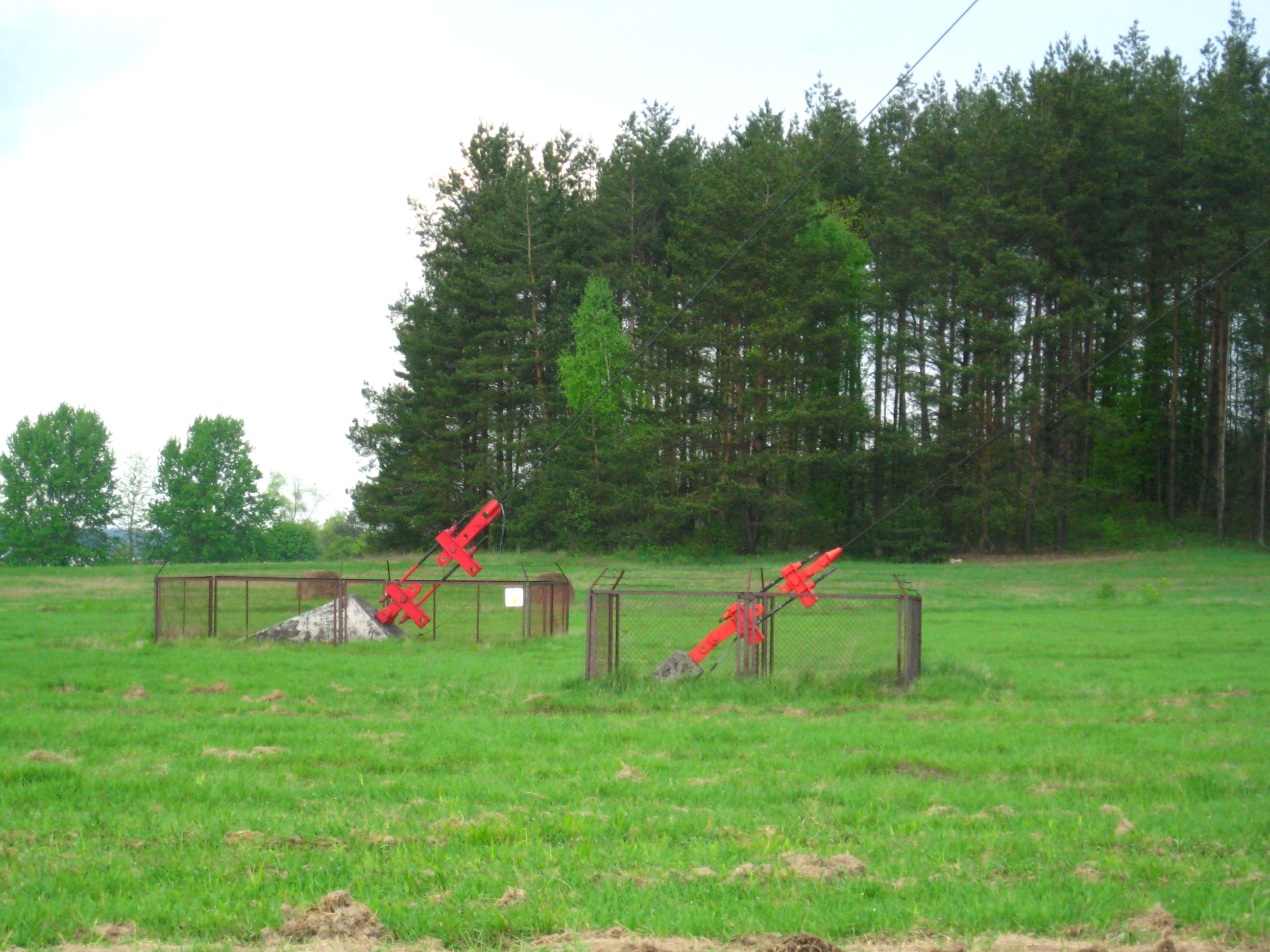
Anchorages of the main mast's guy-wires

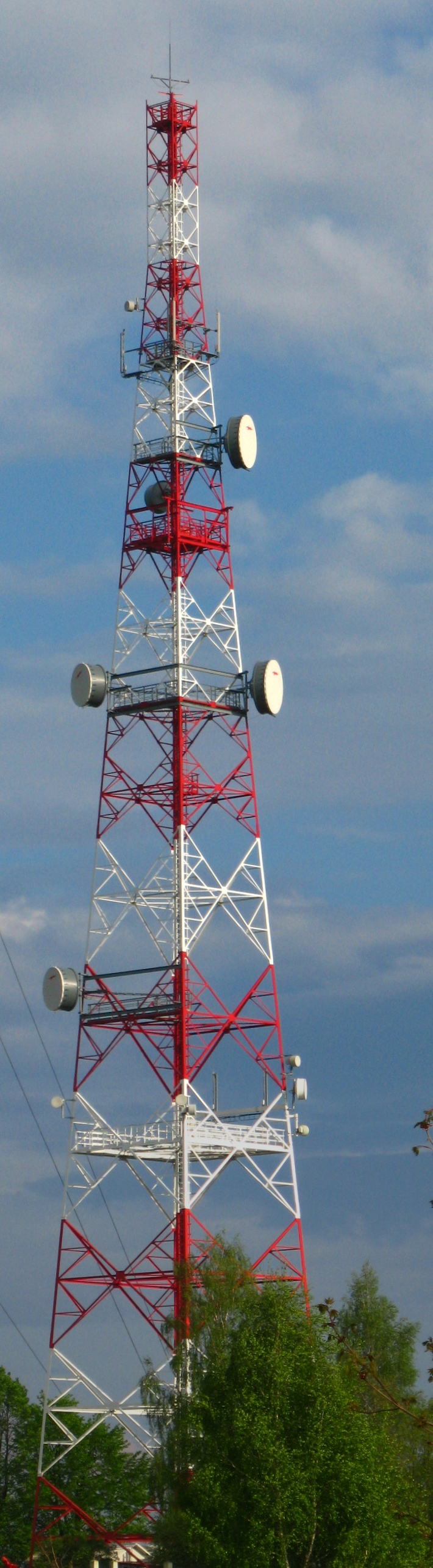
Lattice steel communications tower

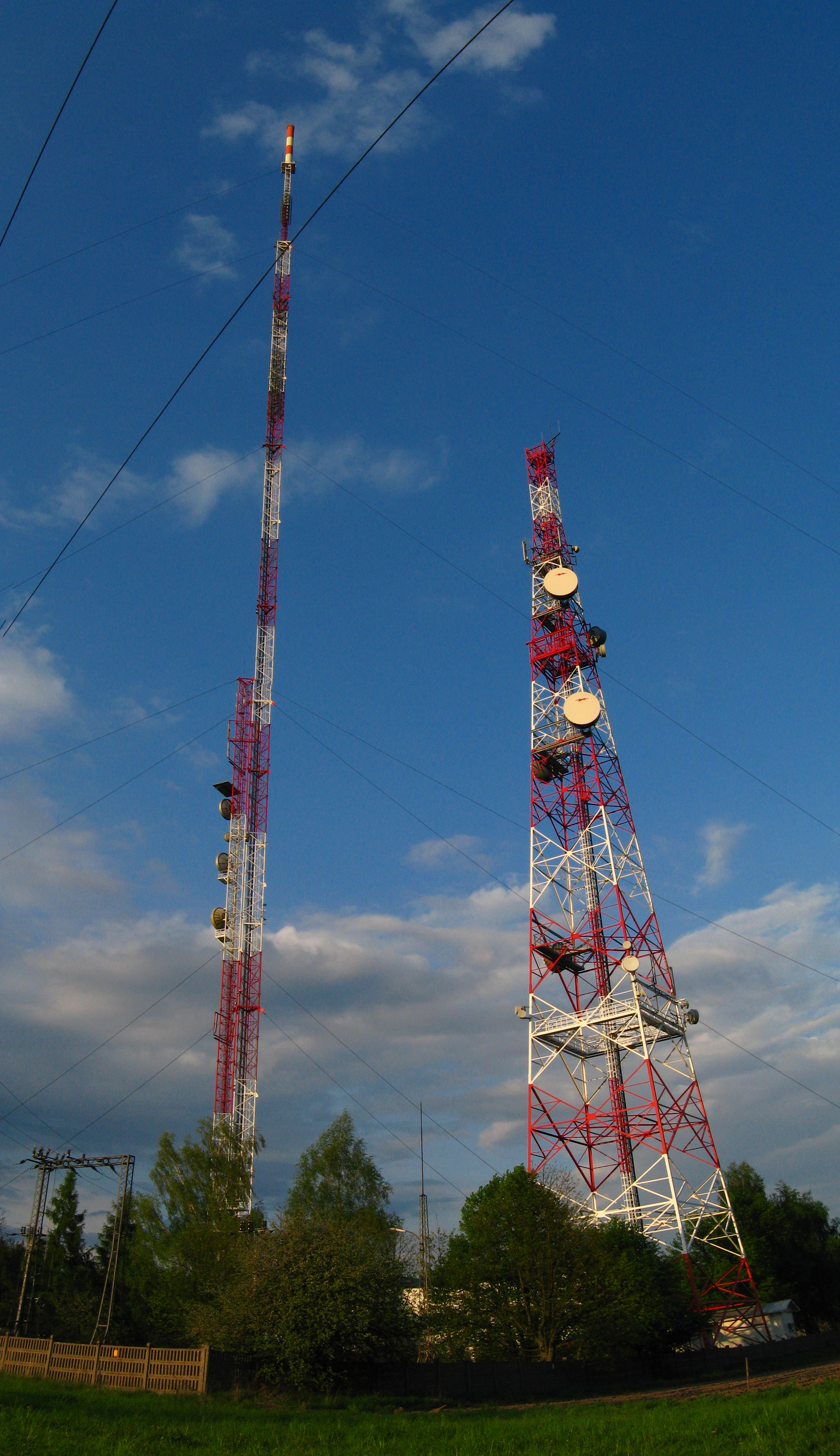
Front, right: steel lattice, communications tower; Middle, left: „old”, second mast — 102m; Rear, center: main mast — 331m

== See also ==
- List of masts
