= Niva (newspaper) =

Niwa
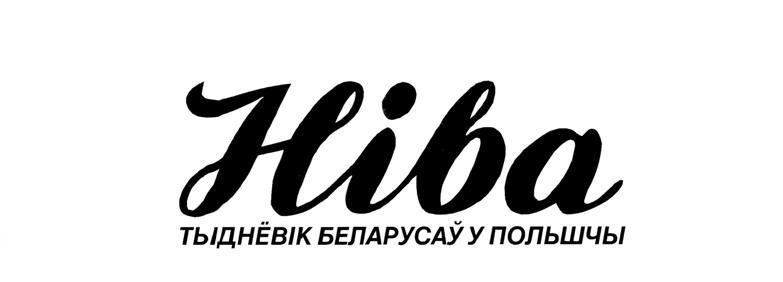

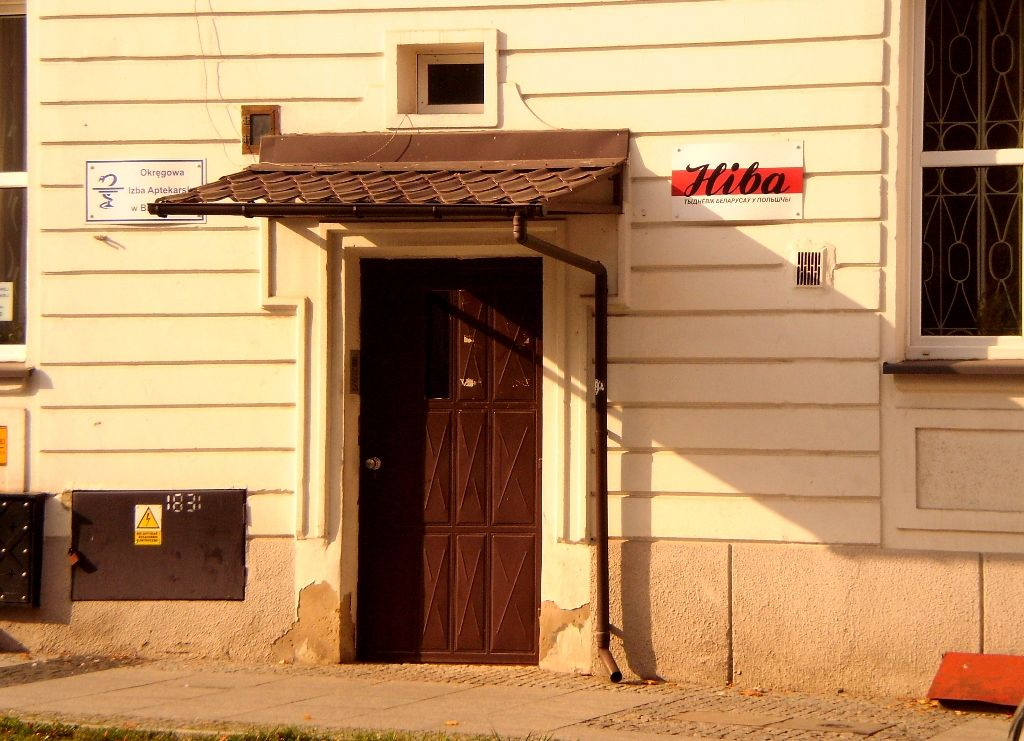
- Headquarters of Niva in Białystok
- Type: Weekly newspaper
- Founder(s): Jerzy Wołkowycki
- Editor-in-chief: Eugeniusz Wappa
- Founded: 4 March 1956; 69 years ago
- Language: Belarusian
- Headquarters: Białystok
- City: Białystok
- Country: Poland
- Website: niva.bialystok.pl

Niva (Belarusian: Ніва) is a weekly newspaper in Belarusian language published by the Belarusian minority in Poland. The newspaper was founded in 1956 in Białystok for Belarusians living in Poland. Niva was an important factor uniting the Belarusian minority in the region. Chief editor is Eugeniusz Wappa.

== History ==
The first issue of Niva was published on 4 March 1956. During the thaw of that year, a lot of national minority societies and their press organs were established in Poland. The circulation of the weekly oscillated from 10,000 in the 1960s to 2-3,000 today.
