= Kilińskiego Street, Białystok =

Street in Białystok, Poland

Kilińskiego Street
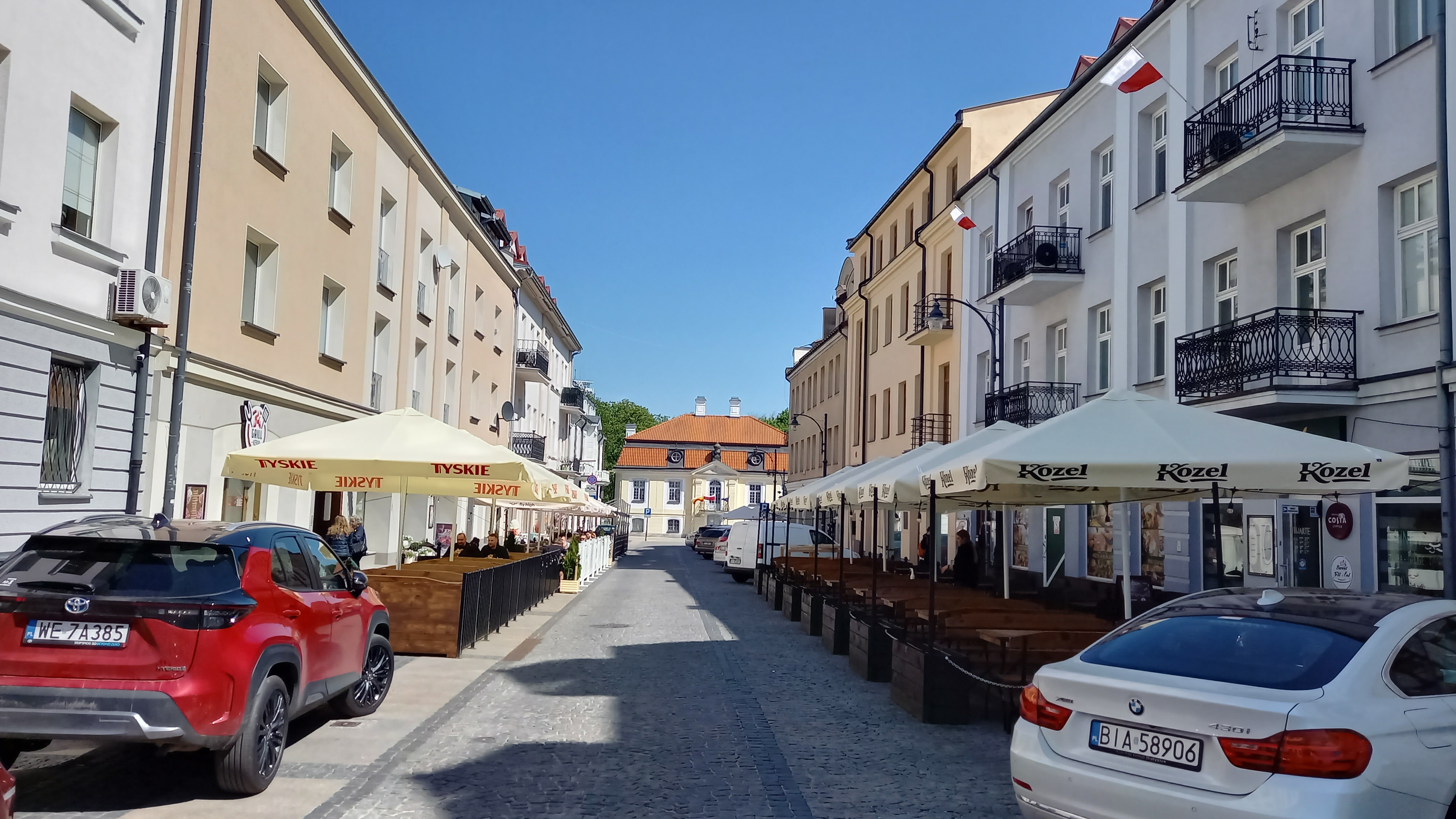
- Interactive map of Kilińskiego Street
- Native name: Ulica Kilińskiego (Polish)
- Former name: Niemicka
- Type: Street
- Length: 230 m (750 ft)
- Location: Centrum District, Białystok
- Coordinates: 53°07′56″N 23°09′54″E

Jana Kilińskiego Street (Polish: Ulica Jana Kilińskiego) is a street in the central district of Białystok, running from Kościelna Street to Jana Pawła II Square. While being a relatively short street, it has a long-time importance in the city's history.

== History ==
The course of today's Kilińskiego Street was created in the 18th century. It ran along the banks of two ponds, which were an element of the composition of the space around the Branicki Palace. These ponds occupied the entire area between the undeveloped, odd-numbered side of the street and the fence of the palace courtyards. Between them, a causeway was built, in which small culverts were made. To maintain communication between the street and the palace, small wooden bridges were thrown over the causeway. The street had no name. Its buildings were objects directly related to the functioning of the manor. The first building from the church side was a brick coach house. In 1806, a mason's lodge was built in its place. Behind the coach house there was a wooden riding arena, and further on stood the houses of the court ballet. In the years 1766–1771, a guest palace was built in the perspective of the street, around which a small garden was established. From the mid-19th century this street, already called Niemiecka, began to be built up. The ponds were liquidated and the entire area was densely urbanized at the end of the century. Niemiecka Street was one of the representative places of the city. There were famous photographic studios here: Bartman and "Rembrandt", the "Polnocny" hotel, bank and insurance company offices. In the no longer existing house of Judel Krupnicki, which stood opposite the current building number 16, there was one of the most elegant restaurants in Białystok called "Ermitaz". In 1919, following Poland's regaining of independence and the establishment of the Second Polish Republic this street was named after Jan Kiliński. Due to its location, the streets was a popular choice for lawyers and doctors for living. During the reconstruction that followed the World War II, it was decided not to recreate the pre-war layout of the buildings. The overriding goal was to properly display the Branicki Palace. Therefore, the surviving fragments of the frontage were left, while the burnt-out outbuildings of the townhouses were demolished. This did not add charm to the palace, and at the same time, the extremely characteristic atmosphere of this part of the city was erased in this way. The last, controversial action was the blowing up of the burnt-out walls of the legendary Ritz Hotel in 1946.

== Buildings ==
- Kilińskiego 2 – Hotel Ritz – (non-existent)
- Kilińskiego 6 – Branicki Guest Palace (Equerry's House) – (currently the Civil Registry Office)
- Kilińskiego 6 (?) – non-existent Palace Theatre
- Kilińskiego 7 – Army Museum in Białystok
- Kilińskiego 8 – Makowski Tenement House
- Kilińskiego 10 – Rozenblum Tenement House
- Kilińskiego 11 – Efroim Perelsztejn Tenement House
- Kilińskiego 14 – District Prosecutor's Office
- Kilińskiego 15 – Jossema Tenement House (currently a hotel)
- Kilińskiego 16 – former Masonic Lodge
