= Kurier Poranny (modern) =

Polish daily newspaper

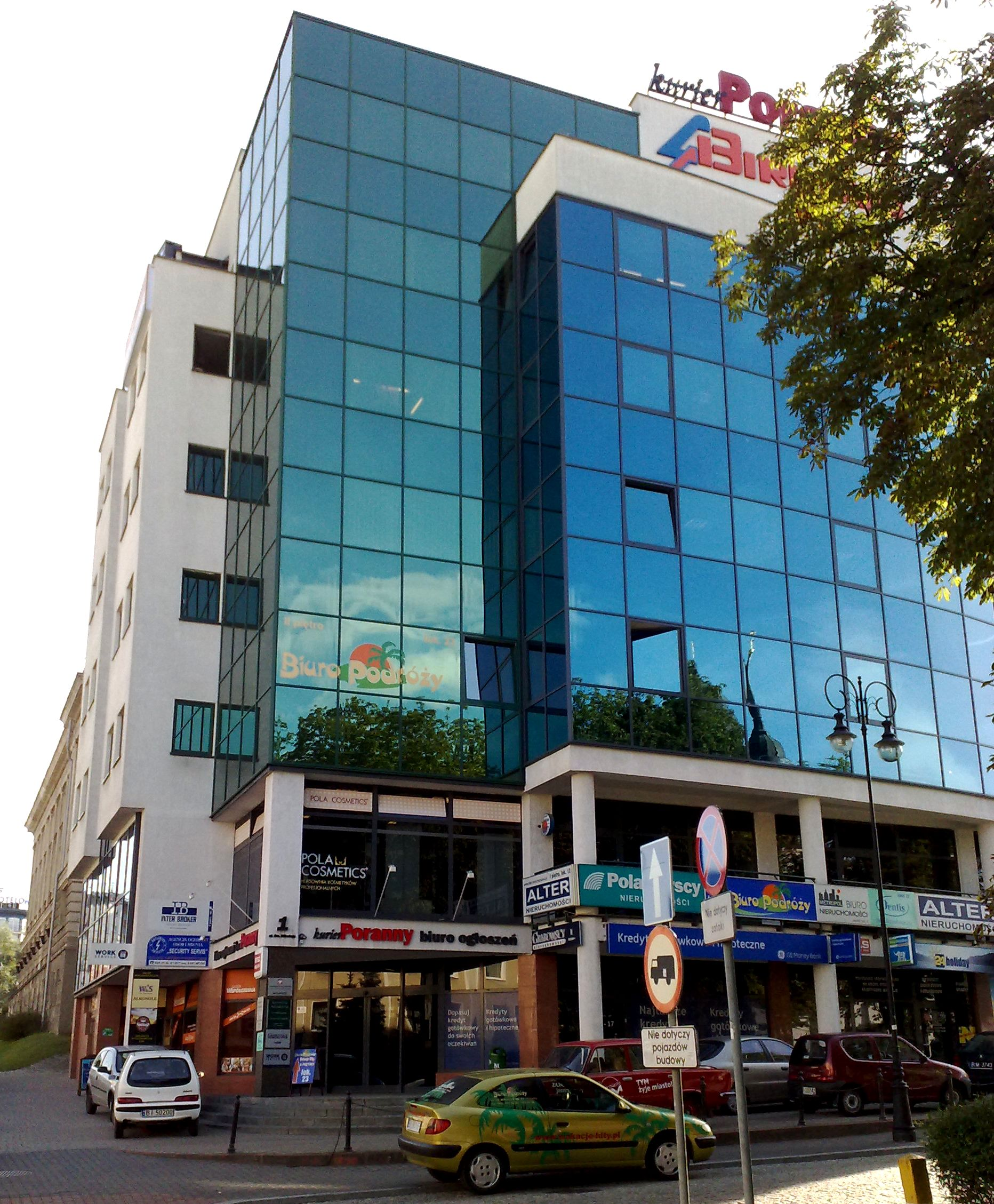
- Offices of Kurier Poranny
- Founded: 1990; 35 years ago
- Language: Polish
- Headquarters: Białystok, Poland

Kurier Poranny (Polish pronunciation: [ˈku.rjɛr pɔˈran.nɘ], "Morning Courier") is a daily newspaper in Białystok and the Podlaskie region of Poland. It was founded in 1990 (Issue 0 was released on December 21, 1989).

The newspaper was owned by the publishing house Polska Press sp. z o.o, which was taken over by Polish Oil Concern Orlen on March 1, 2021 (its largest shareholder is the State Treasury).

== Supplements ==
Monday: Moje auto (My car)
Tuesday: Praca i nauka (Jobs and schools)
Wednesday: Mój dom i nieruchomości (My house and properties)
Thursday: Weekend (Weekend)
Friday: Album Białostocki (Bialystok Album)
Saturday: Pupile (Pupils)
