= Osiedle Leśna Dolina, Białystok =

Leśna Dolina
- District (osiedle) of Białystok
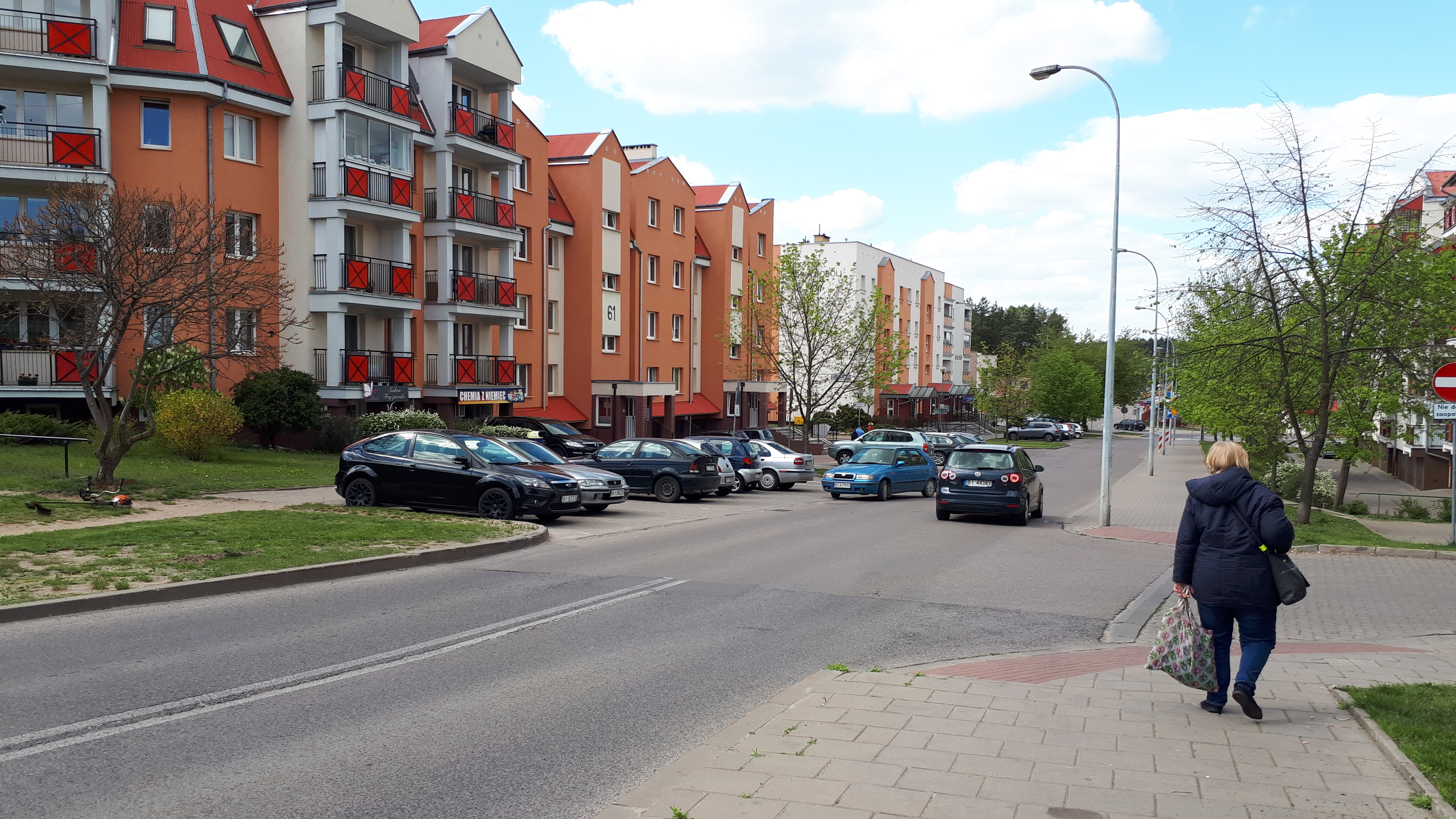
- Boboli Street in the district

- Coordinates: 53°08′10″N 23°05′21″E
- Country: Poland
- Voivodeship: Podlaskie
- City: Białystok

Area
  - Total: 2.655 km^{2} (1.025 sq mi)

Leśna Dolina is one of the districts of the Polish city of Białystok. It has many green areas, with trees and fields. Most of the district is residential, with blocks of flats and houses.

== History ==
Leśna Dolina was the third unit of the housing estate built by the "Słoneczny Stok" housing cooperative (The first was "Sloneczny Stok" district and the second was Zielone Wzgórza. The first blocks were built at the turn of the 1980s and 1990s in the area where Armii Krajowej Street runs today. They were still blocks made of large slab technology. Similar to Zielone Wzgórza, service and commercial premises are located on the lower ground floors, from the street side. In the early 1990s, the second church was built in this part of the residential complex. It is the Orthodox Church of the Resurrection, erected according to the design of Jan Kabac, Jerzy Uścinowicz and Władysław Ryżyński.
