= Białystok Zielone Wzgórza =

Major Railway station in the city of Białystok

Coordinates: 53.1155°N 23.1030°E

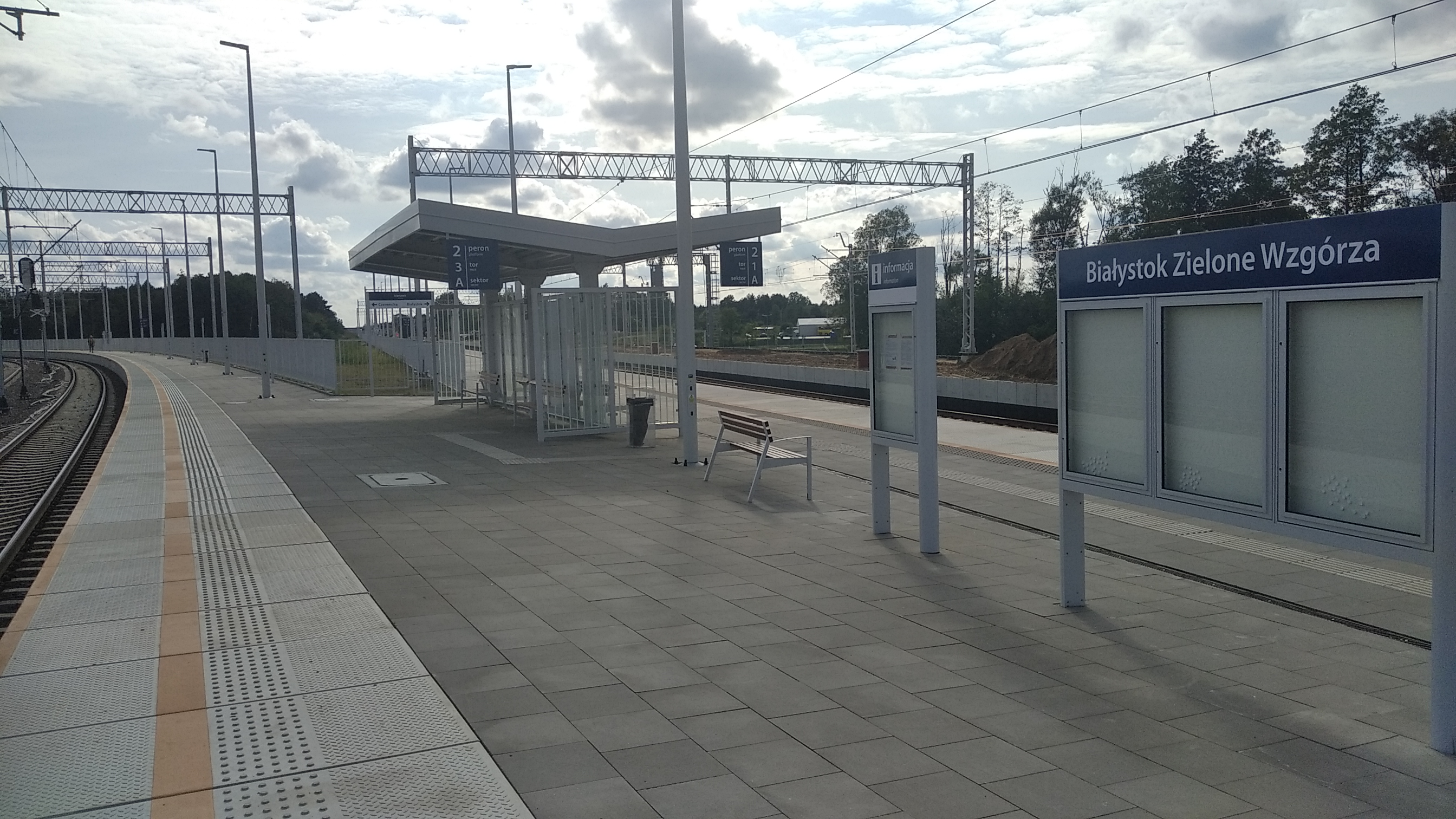
- View from the station platforms

General information
- Location: 15-670 Białystok
- Owner: Polskie Koleje Państwowe S.A.
- Platforms: 2
- Tracks: 4
- Train operators: PKP Intercity; Polregio
- Bus routes: 21, 23, 28
- Bus stands: 2

Construction
- Structure type: Elevated
- Parking: Unguarded parking spaces
- Accessible: Yes

Other information
- Classification: Passenger Station

History
- Opened: 3 September 2023

Services
To Czeremcha, Siedlce, Białystok, Szepietowo, Ełk, Warszawa, Łódź, Kraków, Vilnius
Location

Białystok Zielone Wzgórza is a passenger stop in the Zielone Wzgórza District of Białystok in the Podlaskie Voivodeship in Poland. The stop has two platforms, and its construction was carried out in connection with the modernization of the Zielonka – Kuźnica Białostocka railway line, with it being a part of the E75 railway line (Also called Rail Baltica).

Due to the close proximity, the station replaced Białystok Wiadukt, which was closed in January 2023. Białystok Zielone Wzgórza was opened on 3 September 2023.

== See also ==
- Białystok railway station
