= St. Jadwiga Church (Białystok) =

St. Jadwiga Church in Białystok
- Kościół pw. św. Jadwigi Królowej w Białymstoku
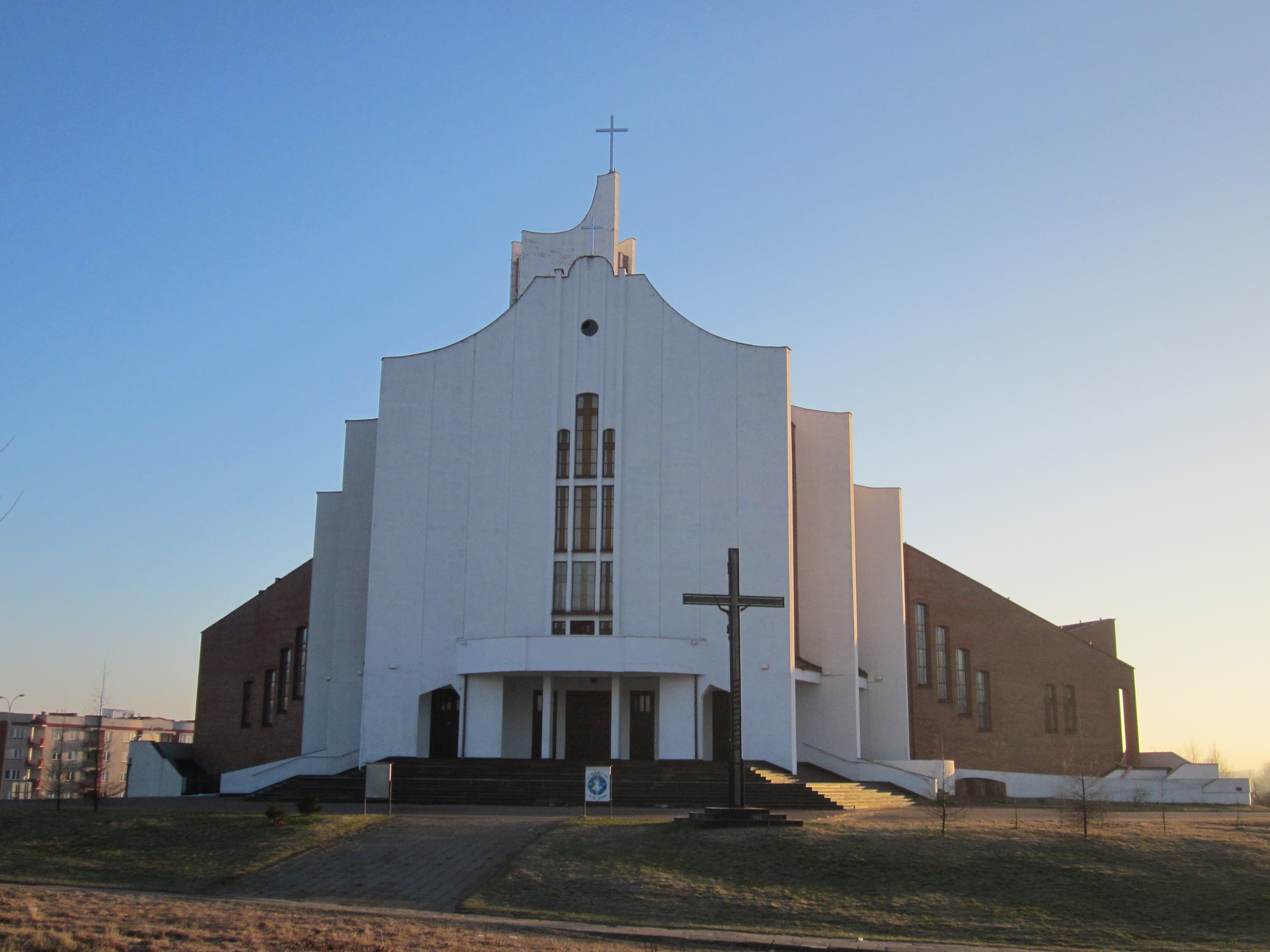
- St. Jadwiga Church in Białystok
- 53°07′32″N 23°06′06.51″E
- Location: 8 Słonecznikowa, Zielone Wzgórza District, Białystok
- Denomination: Roman Catholic

History
- Consecrated: 12 August 1984

Architecture
- Architect: Marian Szymański
- Style: Modenism
- Groundbreaking: 1985
- Completed: 1988

St. Jadwiga Church in Białystok (Polish: Kościół pw. św. Jadwigi Królowej w Białymstoku) is a Roman Catholic parish church located in the Zielone Wzgórza District in the city Białystok capital of Podlaskie Voivodeship in north-eastern Poland. The church and parish were established on February 7, 1984.

== History ==
Due to the construction of the multi-thousand housing estates of Słoneczny Stok and Zielone Wzgórza in the 1970s in the parish of St. Andrzej Boboli, Fr. Stefan Girstun, as parish priest and dean of the Białystok-Starosielce deanery, asked Bishop Edward Kisiel to decide to build a new church in this deanery.

Construction of a new bishop's church In April 1983, Edward Kisiel commissioned Fr. Stanisław Wojno, vicar of the parish in Starosielce. Initially, it was planned to give this church the title of Saint. Maksymilian Kolbe. However, on May 13, 1983, the Archbishop's Curia notified Fr. Dean Stefan Girstun that priority in receiving this title is given to the church currently under construction in Pietrasze. Fr. prob. Stefan Girstun announced a competition for a new temple and on July 31, the jury, chaired by M.Sc. Eng. arenas. Mieczysław Krzywiec awarded first place and selected the project for implementation to Eng. arch. Marian Szymański. Finally, under a special indult of the Primate of Poland, Cardinal. Józef Glemp of November 3, 1983, the church and parish in the Słoneczny Stok estate were given the title of blessed Jadwiga the Queen.

On February 7, 1984, Bishop Edward Kisiel erected the parish of Blessed Jadwiga Queen, and the next day he nominated the parish priest, Fr. Stanisław Wojno, who on March 30, 1984, signed a conditional agreement for the purchase of plot no. 2060. On May 11, the deed of ownership of this plot for the construction of a new church was signed at the Notary Office. On August 12, 1984, Bishop Edward Kisiel consecrated the square for the construction of the church of Blessed. Jadwiga the Queen. The construction of the temple began in the spring of 1985. In the fall of 1988, the lower church was opened, where services began to be held.

On July 21, 2019, priests serving in the church posted a controversial entry on the parish website expressing thanks to all people defending traditional values in any way during the First Equality March in Białystok, when hooligan groups threw stones, glass bottles and firecrackers at policemen and march participants, and they also committed severe beatings not only to the participants of the March, but also to people they accidentally met, using vulgar words and spitting on the victims. The parish's entry caused an avalanche of comments in the community media and national media and was the subject of public debate. Only after the case was publicized and the Polish Episcopate issued an official statement condemning the acts of aggression and violence committed by Białystok hooligans, the parish modified its entry, claiming that it was not grateful for the way the march went.
