= Orthodox Church of the Resurrection in Białystok =

- Cerkiew Zmartwychwstania Pańskiego w Białymstoku
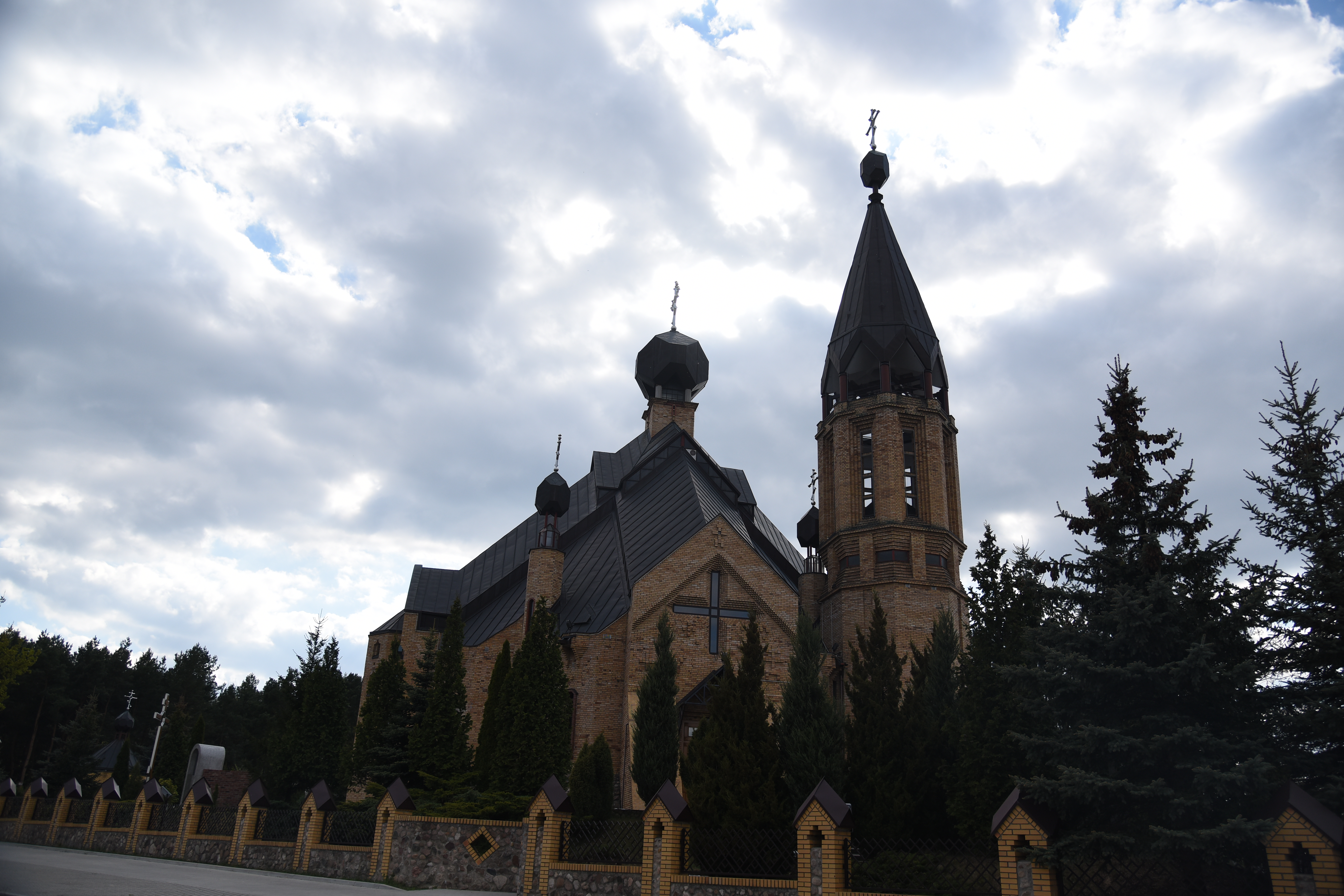
- Orthodox Church of the Resurrection in Białystok
- 53°07′53″N 23°05′55″E
- Location: 9 Sikorskiego, Leśna Dolina District, Białystok
- Denomination: Eastern Orthodox
- Website: woskresienska.pl

Architecture
- Architect(s): Jan Kabac, Jerzy Uścinowicz, Władysław Ryżyński
- Style: Byzantine architecture
- Groundbreaking: November 1991
- Completed: 1994

Administration
- Diocese: Białystok and Gdańsk
- Deanery: Białystok

Orthodox Church of the Resurrection in Białystok (Polish: Cerkiew Zmartwychwstania Pańskiego w Białymstoku) is an Orthodox parish church in Białystok. It belongs to the Białystok Deanery of the Diocese of Białystok-Gdańsk of the Polish Autocephalous Orthodox Church. The church is located in the Leśna Dolina District, at 9 Władysława Sikorskiego Street. The church relates in its tradition to a church of the same name which existed in Białystok until 1938.

== History ==
Since 1983, Father Michal Chomczyk and Father Andrzej Berezowiec visited Białystok offices, making efforts to find a location for a new church, which was to be built in the Słoneczny Stok housing estate which was at early stages of construction those days. After four years, the Voivodeship Office indicated a plot of land on Sikorskiego Street, on the edge of a small forest, on the border of Słoneczny Stok and the then non-existent Leśna Dolina District. The plot measured 6,603 square meters. Aleksy Czykwin, a long-time church starost together with Andrzej Berezowiec fundraised Orthodox families for donations for the parish that was being built.

The history of the parish, on February 14, 1989, began with decree no. 40/89 by which Archbishop Sawa of Białystok and Gdańsk brought into being a new Białystok parish. It was territorially separated from the parish of the Dormition of the Mother of God in Białystok-Starosielce. By the same decree, for the newly erected parish, Archbishop Sawa established an annual holiday on Antipascha Sunday. By another decree of the same day, the head of the diocese appointed priest Włodzimierz Cybuliński as parish priest. A dozen or so days earlier, on January 25, 1989, in the State Notary Office at Legionowa 20 street, notarial deed Wu 30.706 was signed, under which the Orthodox Church received for perpetual use (from December 6, ownership) a plot of land at Sikorskiego Street 9, for the construction of a new church and rectory.

On May 7, 1989, the first ceremonial service in the history of the estate took place on the occasion of Antipascha Sunday. The holy liturgy, with the participation of the clergy of the city of Białystok, was led by the Archbishop of Białystok and Gdańsk Sawa. After the liturgy, a procession took place, the consecration of the cross and the site for the construction of a new, temporary church. On May 8, 1989, the parish received permission to build a temporary, wooden church.

The building of the temporary chapel was largely built by the parishioners in a social effort. The enthusiasm for work was enormous, despite the rampant inflation, the shortage of building materials, the lack of telephones, 30-40 people came to the construction site every day. Thanks to this, less than a year after the consecration of the cross, also on Antipascha Sunday, April 22, 1990, after a solemn holy liturgy on the construction site, a procession took place, as well as the consecration of the cross and the laying of the cornerstone for the construction of the new church. At the same time, the place where the cornerstone was laid for the construction of the parish house and the catechism point was consecrated. A month earlier, in March 1990, the city authorities approved the development plan for the investment area, issuing permits for the construction of the church, parish building, belfry, car park and planned connections.

On April 22, 1990, the cornerstone for the construction of the church was laid. It turned out to be a great challenge for the builders and masons. The construction of the new church began in November 1991. Within a month, the parishioners made the foundation, reinforced concrete benches for the church and the cornerstone, resting at the foot of the oak cross, found its place in the foundation bench of the altar part for eternity. In the years 1992–1993, construction work continued, the aim of which was to prepare the underground part of the church for the stage of erecting the walls. Much of this work was done by the parishioners themselves, supported by the parish priest, Włodzimierz Cybulinski and the parish priests. The pace of work depended on the amount of money collected, mainly from collections among the worshipers, Koledari singing and from sponsors who provided various building materials. At the same time, from 15 June 1990, a parish house was being built, which was to contain apartments for the clergy and rooms for catechism classes. In 1994, upon receipt of the complete documentation, the construction of the walls of the new church began, which was already taken care of by a professional construction company.

On June 9, 1998, Sawa, Metropolitan of Warsaw and All Poland, consecrated the cross placed on the main dome. On April 18, 1999, Jakub, Bishop of Białystok and Gdańsk, consecrated 4 crosses on the side domes of the church. On October 1, 1999, the second parish holiday was established in honor of Our Lady of the Wsiecaryska (All-Queen). On this occasion, the metropolitan, assisted by Bishop Jakub and the clergy, consecrated the cross for the bell tower and the bells.

On August 21, 2016, the church was visited by a delegation of the Greek Orthodox Patriarchate of Antioch headed by Patriarch John X of Antioch, and in August 2018 - a delegation of the Orthodox Church in America headed by Metropolitan Tikhon Mollard.

== Architecture ==
Although the idea of building the church was a direct reference to the pre-war Cathedral of the Resurrection of the Lord as its continuation, in terms of architecture this church does not refer in any way to its predecessor.

The church was designed by architects Jan Kabac and Jerzy Uścinowicz and the construction engineer was Władysław Ryżyński. The church refers to the Old Russian and Novgorod traditions, using the form of sacral construction in Podlasie. In the spatial solution of the interior of the church, a central plan was used, which is to be an image of an interpenetrating Greek cross.
