= Osiedle Zielone Wzgórza, Białystok =

Zielone Wzgórza
- District (osiedle) of Białystok
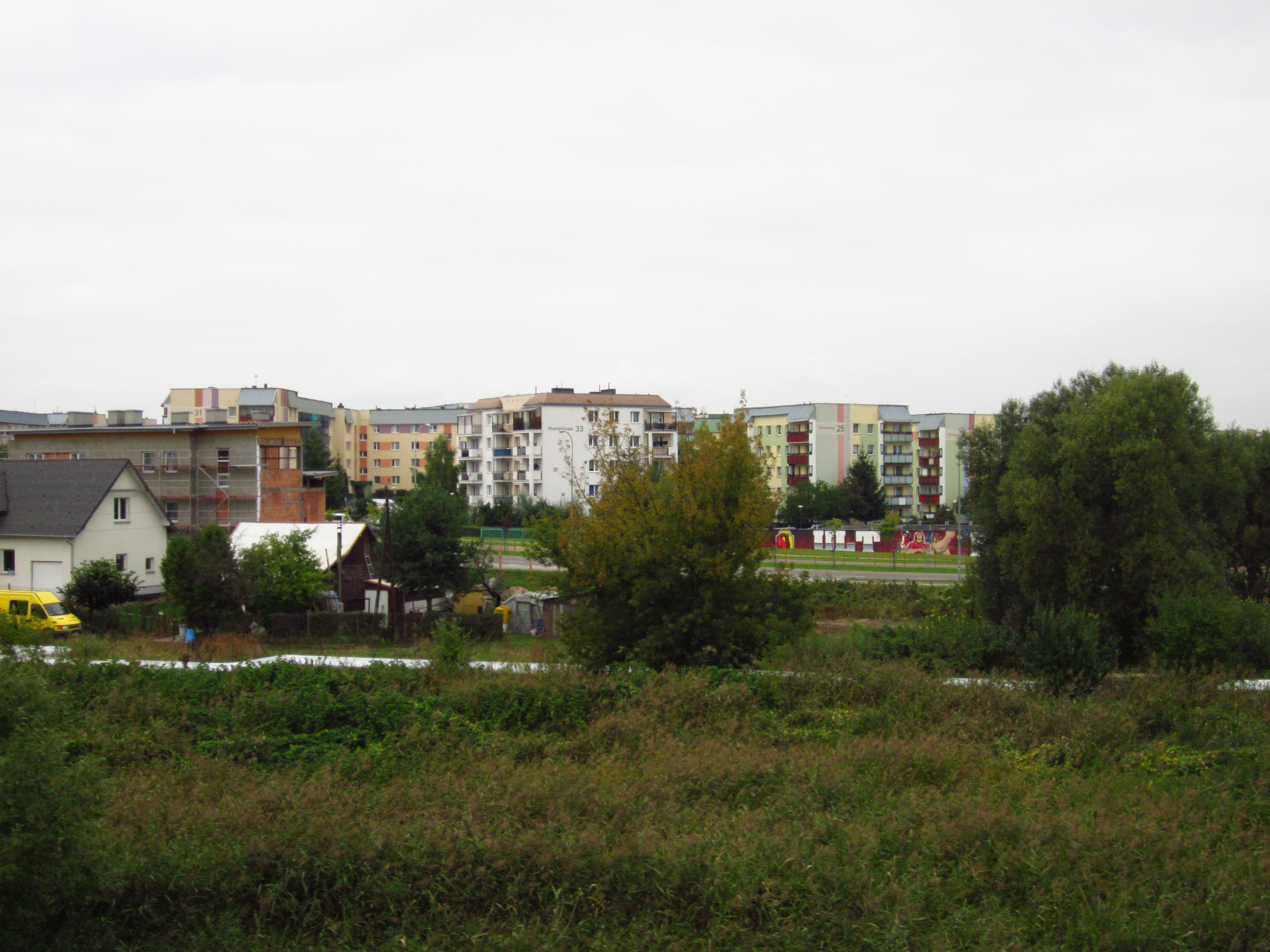
- View of Zielone Wzgórza, 2013

- Location of Zielone Wzgórza within Białystok
- Coordinates: 53°07′20″N 23°06′16″E
- Country: Poland
- Voivodeship: Podlaskie
- City: Białystok

Area
  - Total: 1.186 km^{2} (0.458 sq mi)
- Time zone: UTC+1 (CET)
  - Summer (DST): UTC+2 (CEST)
- Area code: +48 85
- Vehicle registration: BI

Zielone Wzgórza is one of the districts of the Polish city of Białystok.

== History ==
The district was constructed from the mid 1980s. Alongside with the construction of the buildings, the then pastor of the Catholic parish of st. Andrzej Bobola in Starosielce, he initiated the construction of a new church at the junction of Słoneczny Stok and Zielone Wzgórza. In 1984, the faithful began to pray in a makeshift chapel. Two years later, the construction of the St. Jadwiga Church, designed by Marian Szymański.

The dominant type of buildings within Zielone Wzgorza are four-floor apartment buildings with balconies, and small business area on the 1st floor of the outside wall of the buildings set-up in the shape of a letter "U". In the middle of each U-shaped grouping of buildings there are parking lot, recreational area for small children, trash disposal, and place to clean rugs and carpets as well as low growing coniferous trees and grass. Each unit within a given building is assigned a basement cell as well as parking space.
