= Kozly =

Kozly may refer to places in the Czech Republic:

- Kozly (Česká Lípa District), a municipality and village in the Liberec Region
- Kozly (Louny District), a municipality and village in the Ústí nad Labem Region
- Kozly, a village and part of Tišice in the Central Bohemian Region

== See also ==
- Kozły (disambiguation)
