= Bielany (disambiguation) =

Bielany is a district of Warsaw.

Bielany may also refer to:

== Places in Poland ==
- Bielany, Kraków, a neighbourhood in Kraków
- Bielany, a district of Toruń
- Bielany, Lesser Poland Voivodeship (south Poland)
- Bielany, Lower Silesian Voivodeship (south-west Poland)
- Bielany, Lublin Voivodeship (east Poland)
- Bielany, Grójec County in Masovian Voivodeship (east-central Poland)
- Bielany, Lipsko County in Masovian Voivodeship (east-central Poland)
- Bielany, Płońsk County in Masovian Voivodeship (east-central Poland)
- Bielany, Pułtusk County in Masovian Voivodeship (east-central Poland)
- Bielany, Sokołów County in Masovian Voivodeship (east-central Poland)

== Other ==
- Operation Bielany, a 1944 military operation in World War II
- Bielany Aerodrome, a former aerodrome in Bielany, Warsaw, existing from 1938 to 1950
