= Gmina Grabówka =

- Rural municipality
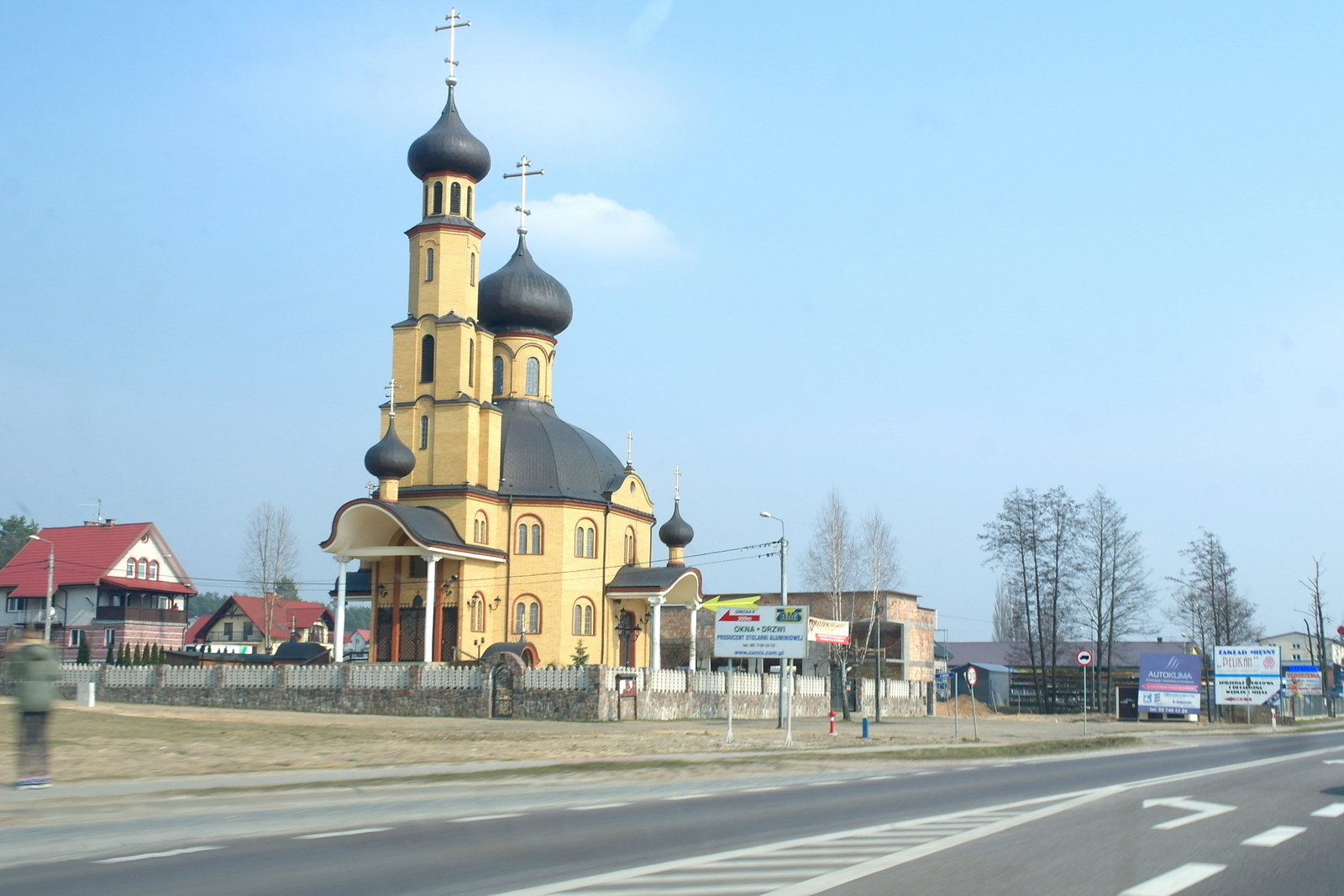
- The Saint Martyr Pantaleon Church in Zaścianki.
- Interactive map of Gmina Grabówka
- Coordinates: 53°07′32″N 23°14′28″E
- Country: Poland
- Voivodeship: Podlaskie
- County: Białystok
- Established: 1 January 2025
- Seat: Zaścianki

Area
  - Total: 64.64 km^{2} (24.96 sq mi)

Population (2025)
  - Total: 10,047
  - Density: 155.4/km^{2} (402.6/sq mi)
- Car plates: BIA

Gmina Grabówka (Polish pronunciation: [ɡraˈbuf.ka]) is a rural municipality in Podlaskie Voivodeship, Poland, located within the Białystok County. Its seat of government is in the village of Zaścianki, while it names comes from Grabówka. The municipality has an area of 64.64 km^{2}, and as of 2025, has the population of 10,047 people. It was created in 2025.

== History ==
Between 1 January 1973 and 30 June 1976, the area used to belong to the municipality of Zaścianki, which had its seat of government in the village of Zaścianki.

The local population postulated for secession from the municipality of Supraśl since the early 2000s. Main reasons where lack of funding from the municipal government, for projects such as road and sewage construction, as well as the fact that the area was cut off from the rest of the municipality by Knyszyn Forest. In 2001, in a public consultation non-binding plebiscite, 1,305 people (84.65%) voted positively for the creation of the new municipality. In a 2015 referendum, held on 24 May, 3,122 people (45%) voted again positively, with the voter turnout of 62%. However, 78% of population of the villages in question voted yes.

On 28 July 2015, the Sejm of Poland passed a resolution, which envisioned the creation of the municipality of Grabówka on 1 January 2016, from the southern portion of the municipality of Supraśl. Its seat of government would be set in Sobolewo. However, it was cancelled with a resolution of the Council of Ministers from 28 December 2015, citing the referendum results. On 1 June 2017, the Constitutional Tribunal declared that such action was against the constitution and the law of municipal governance.

The idea to create the municipality was brought back in 2024, with the Council of Ministers approving it on 1 October. It was created on 1 January 2025.

== Administration ==
The municipality is governed by a mayor (wójt), and council with 15 members. Its seat is located in Zaścianki. It also includes villages of Grabówka, Henrykowo, Sobolewo, and Sowlany, as well as hamlets of Drukowszczyzna, Izoby, Krasny Las, Majówka, Stary Majdan, and Zielona.
