= Sadowy =

Sadowy (feminin: Sadowa), a Polish surname, may refer to:

- Bronisław Sadowy (1925–1984), Polish diver
- Dylan Sadowy, Canadian ice hockey player acquired by the Tulsa Oilers in 2021
- Leszek Sadowy (born 1962), Polish handball player, representative of Poland
- Lidia Sadowa (born 1985), Polish actress
- Piotr Sadowy (born 1980), Polish fencer, exterminator, representative of Poland
- Witold Sadowy (1920–2020), Polish theater and film actor, theater journalist

== See also ==
- Sadowa (disambiguation)
- Sadowy Stok, a settlement in Podlaskie Voivodeship, Poland
- Sadovy (disambiguation)
- Sadowski
