= Kozły =

Kozły may refer to the following places:

- Kozły, Lublin Voivodeship (east Poland)
- Kozły, Białystok County in Podlaskie Voivodeship (north-east Poland)
- Kozły, Bielsk County in Podlaskie Voivodeship (north-east Poland)
- Kozły, Masovian Voivodeship (east-central Poland)
- Kozły, Greater Poland Voivodeship (west-central Poland)
