= Turo =

Turo may refer to:

== People ==
- Ahmose called Turo, Viceroy of Kush in the Eighteenth Dynasty of Egypt
- Turo Asplund (born 1985), Finnish ice hockey player
- Turo Järvinen (born 1982), Finnish ice hockey player
- Turo Pajala (1955–2007), Finnish actor
- Turo Valenzona (born 1942), Filipino basketball player and coach

== Places ==
- Turo (village), Poland
- Turo-Gajówka, Poland
- David Lloyd Club Turó, Spain
- El Turó de la Peira, Spain

== Other ==
- Turo, a dialect of the Konso language
- Turo (company), an American carsharing company
- Turo, another name for quark, a kind of cheese
- Turo's Hevi Gee, a Finnish band
- Planet Turo, a fictional planet in Disney's Lilo & Stitch franchise
- Professor Turo, a fictional character in Pokémon Violet

== See also ==
- Toru (given name), a masculine Japanese given name
