= Pieczonka =

Pieczonka may refer to:

== People ==
- Adrianne Pieczonka, Canadian operatic soprano
- Albert Pieczonka, composer, pianist and music instructor

== Places ==
- Pieczonka, Podlaskie Voivodeship
- Pieczonka, West Pomeranian Voivodeship
