= Turro =

Turro may refer to:

- Turro (Milan), district of Milan, Italy
- Turro (Milan Metro), station on Line 1 of the Milan Metro
- Jesús Turró (born 1952), Spanish sailor
- Nicholas Turro (1938 – 2012), American chemist
- Omar Turro, paralympic athlete from Cuba

== See also ==
- Turo (disambiguation)
