= Drukowszczyzna =

- Settlement
- Location within Poland
- Coordinates: 53°6′10″N 23°18′31″E
- Country: Poland
- Voivodeship: Podlaskie
- County: Białystok
- Gmina: Grabówka

Drukowszczyzna [drukɔfʂˈt͡ʂɨzna] is a settlement in the administrative district of Gmina Grabówka, within Białystok County, Podlaskie Voivodeship, in north-eastern Poland. From 1974 to 2024 it was part of Gmina Supraśl.
