= Majówka, Podlaskie Voivodeship =

Majówka
- Village
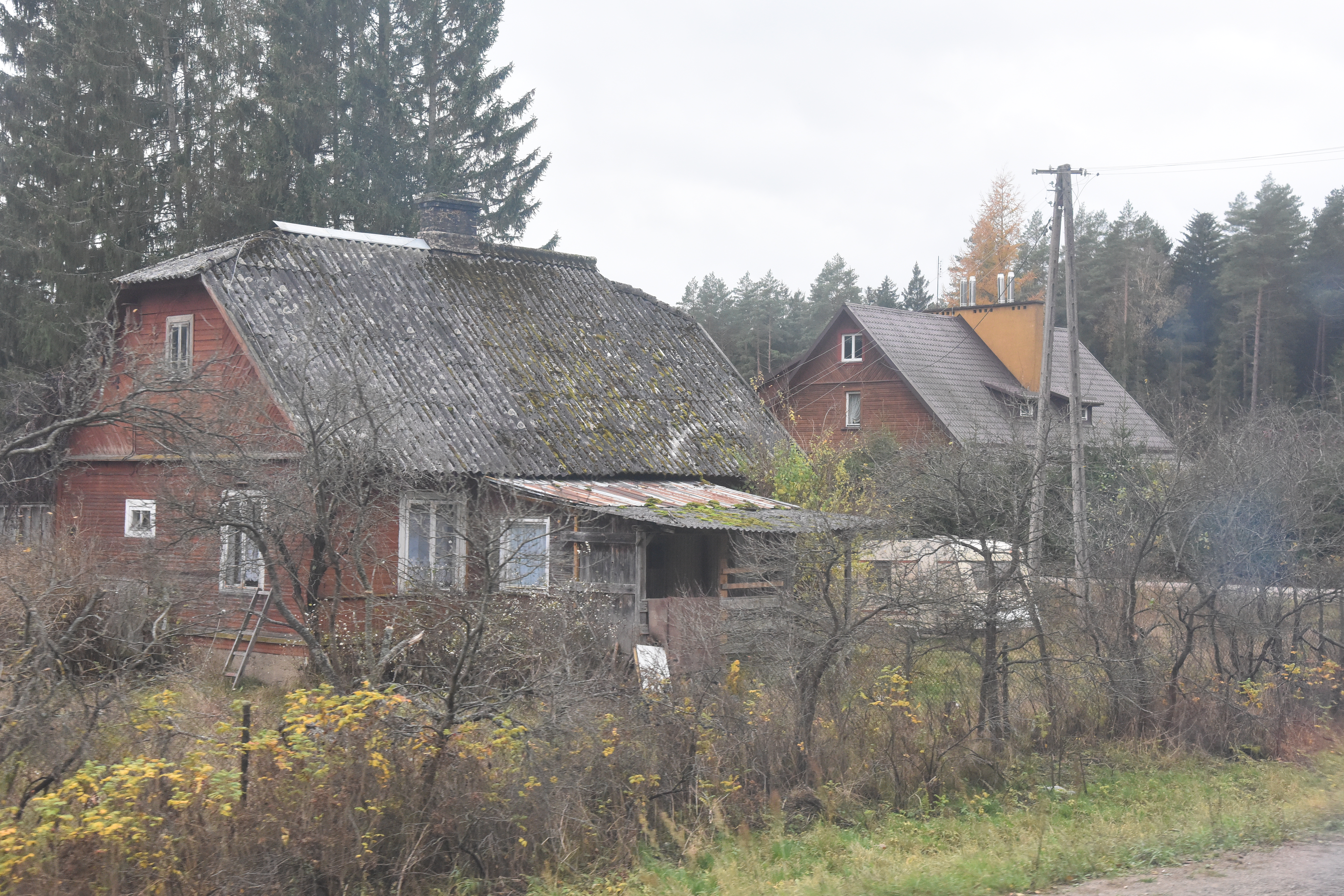

- Location within Poland
- Coordinates: 53°7′31″N 23°20′14″E
- Country: Poland
- Voivodeship: Podlaskie
- County: Białystok
- Gmina: Grabówka
- Population: 10

Majówka [maˈjufka] is a village in the administrative district of Gmina Grabówka, within Białystok County, Podlaskie Voivodeship, in north-eastern Poland. From 1974 to 2024 it was part of Gmina Supraśl.
