= Sobolewo-Kolonia =

- Settlement
- Location within Poland
- Coordinates: 53°7′27″N 23°16′40″E
- Country: Poland
- Voivodeship: Podlaskie
- County: Białystok
- Gmina: Supraśl

Sobolewo-Kolonia [sɔbɔˈlɛvɔ kɔˈlɔɲa] is a settlement in the administrative district of Gmina Supraśl, within Białystok County, Podlaskie Voivodeship, in north-eastern Poland.
