= Grabówka-Kolonia, Podlaskie Voivodeship =

Grabówka-Kolonia
- Settlement
- Location within Poland
- Coordinates: 53°7′46″N 23°14′52″E
- Country: Poland
- Voivodeship: Podlaskie
- County: Białystok
- Gmina: Supraśl

Grabówka-Kolonia [ɡraˈbufka kɔˈlɔɲa] is a settlement in the administrative district of Gmina Supraśl, within Białystok County, Podlaskie Voivodeship, in north-eastern Poland.
