= Koszoły =

- Village
- Location within Poland
- Coordinates: 51°54′N 23°17′E
- Country: Poland
- Voivodeship: Lublin
- County: Biała
- Gmina: Łomazy

Population
  - Total: 390

Koszoły [kɔˈʂɔwɨ] is a village in the administrative district of Gmina Łomazy, within Biała County, Lublin Voivodeship, in eastern Poland.
