= Krasówka, Gmina Łomazy =

Krasówka
- Village
- Location within Poland
- Coordinates: 51°55′N 23°6′E
- Country: Poland
- Voivodeship: Lublin
- County: Biała
- Gmina: Łomazy

Krasówka [kraˈsufka] is a village in the administrative district of Gmina Łomazy, within Biała County, Lublin Voivodeship, in eastern Poland.
