= Woronicze =

- Village
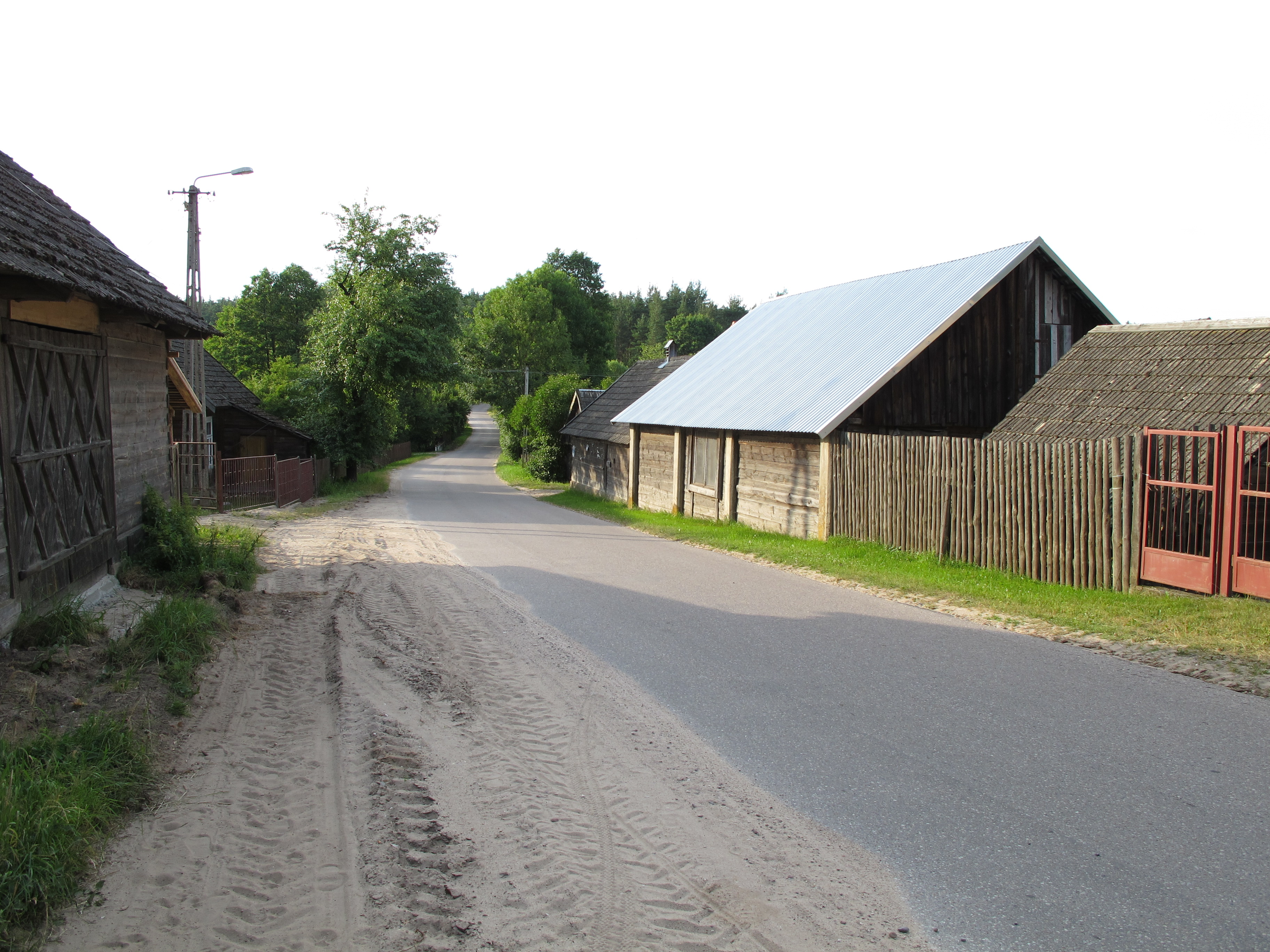
- Houses by the roadside in Woronicze

- Location within Poland
- Coordinates: 53°15′32.73″N 23°28′26.5″E
- Country: Poland
- Voivodeship: Podlaskie
- County: Białystok
- Gmina: Supraśl

Woronicze [vɔrɔˈnit͡ʂɛ] is a village in the administrative district of Gmina Supraśl, within Białystok County, Podlaskie Voivodeship, in north-eastern Poland.
