= Komosa, Podlaskie Voivodeship =

Komosa
- Village
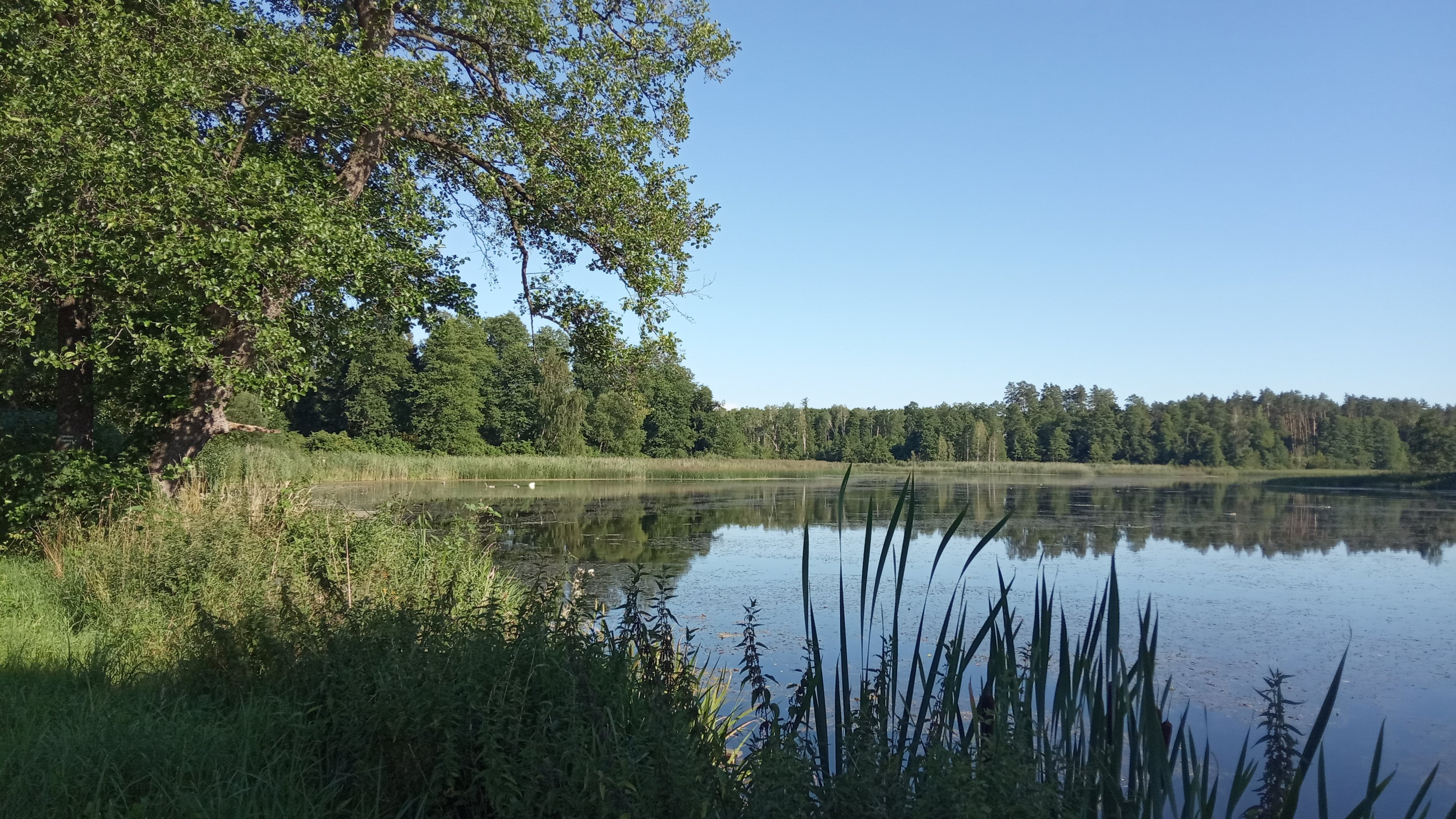

- Location within Poland
- Coordinates: 53°10′54″N 23°15′08″E
- Country: Poland
- Voivodeship: Podlaskie
- County: Białystok
- Gmina: Supraśl

Komosa [kɔˈmɔsa] is a village in the administrative district of Gmina Supraśl, within Białystok County, Podlaskie Voivodeship, in north-eastern Poland.
