= Podjałówka, Białystok County =

Village in Gmina Supraśl, Poland

Podjałówka
- Village
- Location within Poland
- Coordinates: 53°13′58″N 23°28′03″E
- Country: Poland
- Voivodeship: Podlaskie
- County: Białystok
- Gmina: Supraśl

Podjałówka [pɔdjaˈwufka] is a village in the administrative district of Gmina Supraśl, within Białystok County, Podlaskie Voivodeship, in north-eastern Poland.
