= Sobolewo, Białystok County =

Sobolewo
- Village
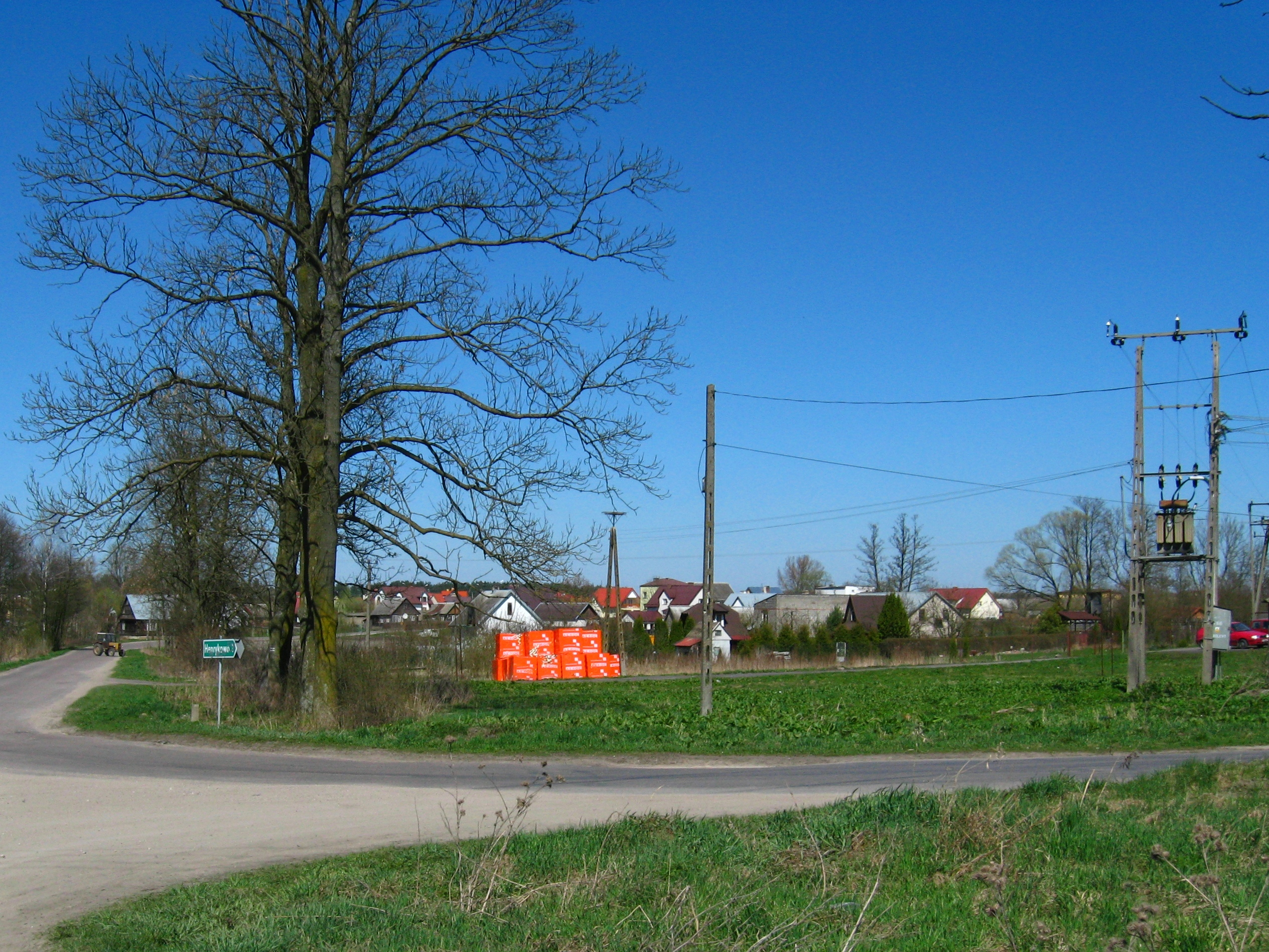

- Location within Poland
- Coordinates: 53°7′N 23°17′E
- Country: Poland
- Voivodeship: Podlaskie
- County: Białystok
- Gmina: Grabówka
- Population: 1,000

Sobolewo ([sɔbɔˈlɛvɔ]) is a village in Podlaskie Voivodeship, Poland, within Gmina Grabówka, Białystok County.
