= Krasny Las =

- Village
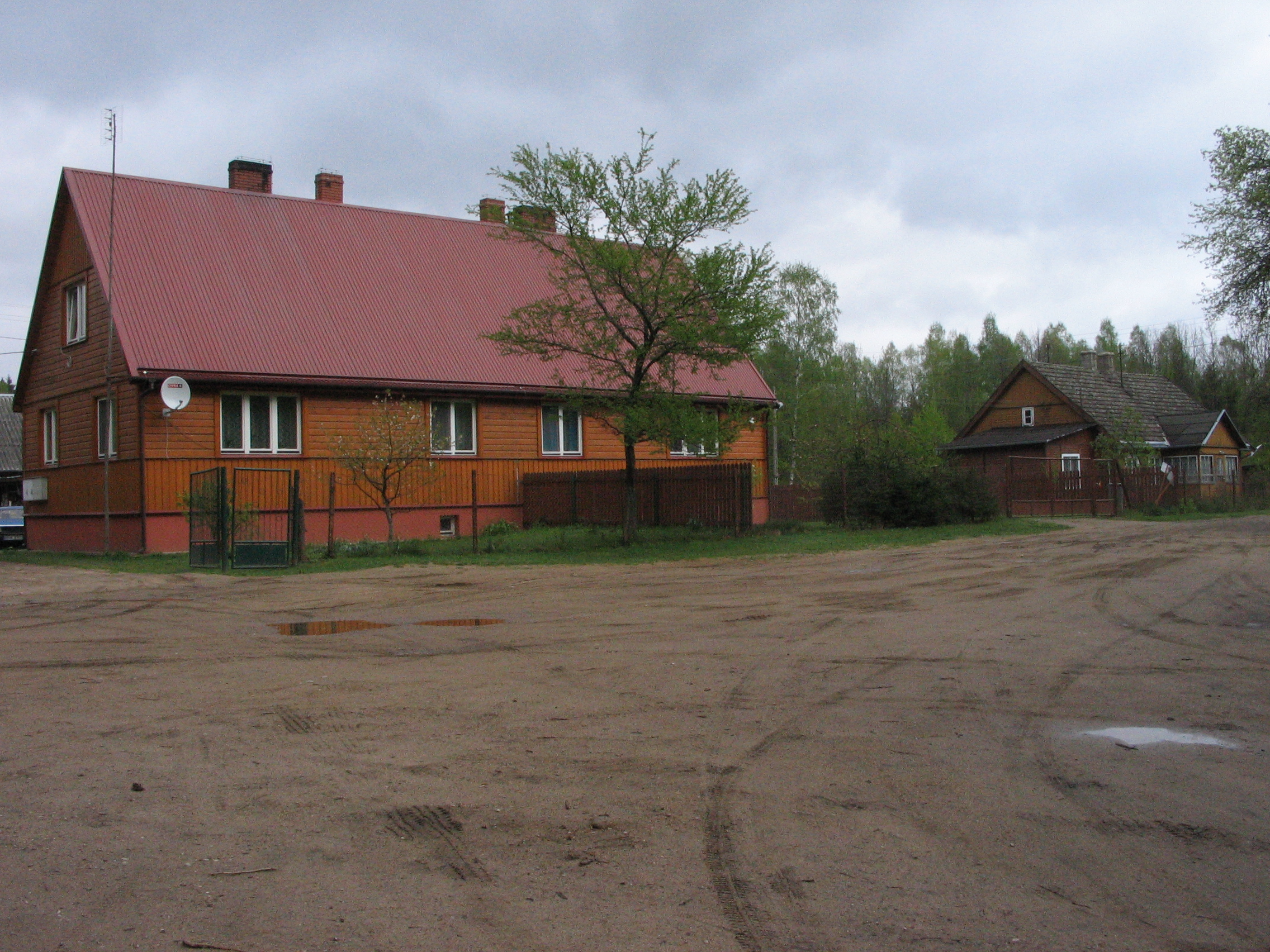
- Entering Krasny Las

- Location within Poland
- Coordinates: 53°10′25″N 23°20′15″E
- Country: Poland
- Voivodeship: Podlaskie
- County: Białystok
- Gmina: Grabówka

Krasny Las [ˈkrasnɨ ˈlas] is a village in the administrative district of Gmina Grabówka, within Białystok County, Podlaskie Voivodeship, in north-eastern Poland. Until January 2025 it was part of Gmina Supraśl.
