= Korczówka, Lublin Voivodeship =

Korczówka
- Village
- Location within Poland
- Coordinates: 51°54′N 23°3′E
- Country: Poland
- Voivodeship: Lublin
- County: Biała
- Gmina: Łomazy

Korczówka [kɔrˈt͡ʂufka] is a village in the administrative district of Gmina Łomazy, within Biała County, Lublin Voivodeship, in eastern Poland.
