= Huszcza Pierwsza =

- Village
- Location within Poland
- Coordinates: 51°51′48″N 23°18′49″E
- Country: Poland
- Voivodeship: Lublin
- County: Biała
- Gmina: Łomazy

Population
  - Total: 1,500

Huszcza Pierwsza [ˈxuʂt͡ʂa ˈpʲɛrfʂa] is a village in the administrative district of Gmina Łomazy, within Biała County, Lublin Voivodeship, in eastern Poland.
