= Podłaźnie =

- Settlement
- Location within Poland
- Coordinates: 53°14′10″N 23°28′8″E
- Country: Poland
- Voivodeship: Podlaskie
- County: Białystok
- Gmina: Supraśl

Podłaźnie [pɔdˈwaʑɲɛ] is a settlement in the administrative district of Gmina Supraśl, within Białystok County, Podlaskie Voivodeship, in north-eastern Poland.
