= Krasne, Białystok County =

Krasne
- Village
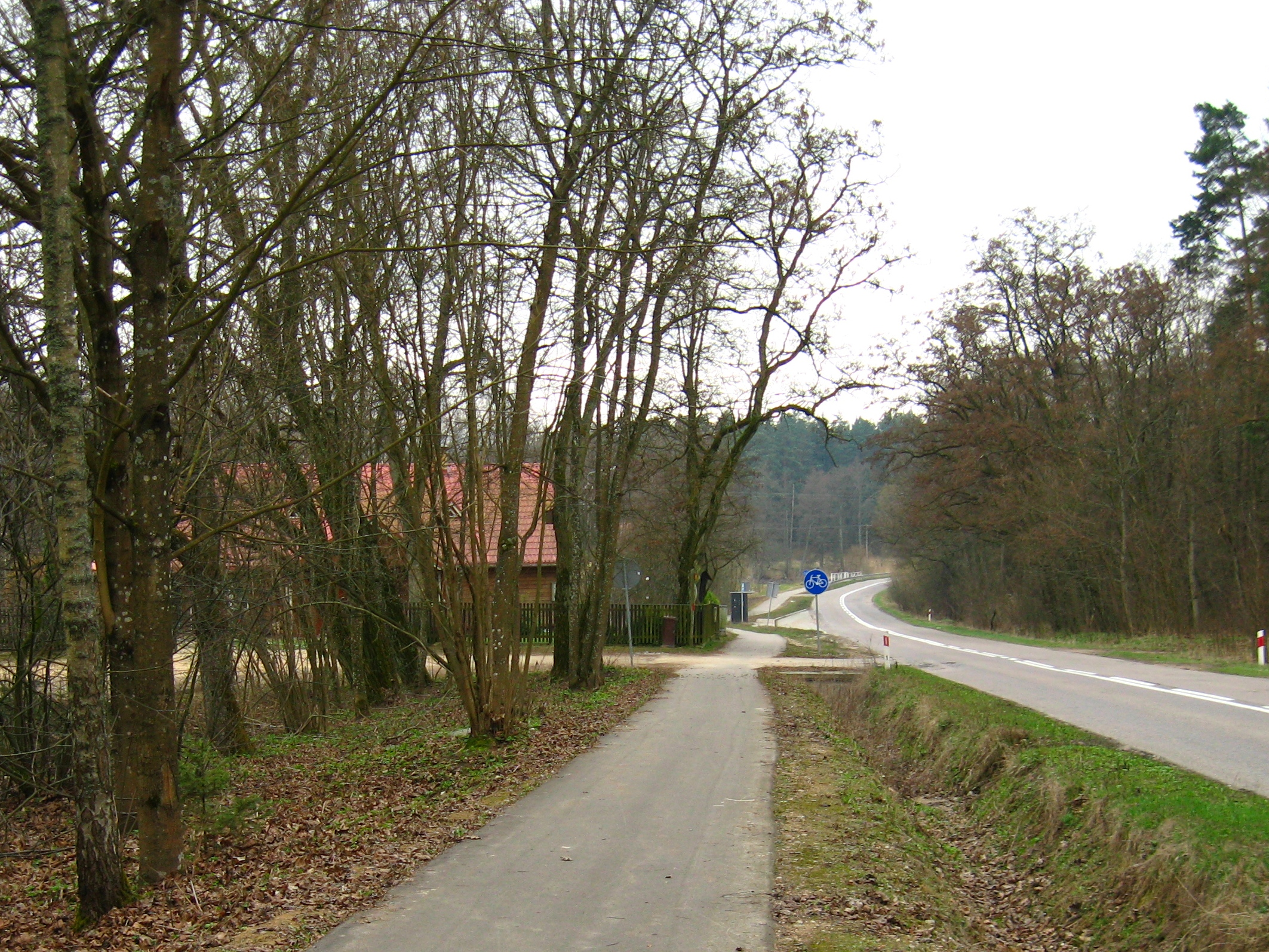

- Location within Poland
- Coordinates: 53°11′42″N 23°17′49″E
- Country: Poland
- Voivodeship: Podlaskie
- County: Białystok
- Gmina: Supraśl
- Population: 20

Krasne [ˈkrasnɛ] is a village in the administrative district of Gmina Supraśl, within Białystok County, Podlaskie Voivodeship, in north-eastern Poland.
