= Podsokołda-Gajówka =

Village in Gmina Supraśl, Poland

- Village
- Location within Poland
- Coordinates: 53°14′06″N 23°27′57″E
- Country: Poland
- Voivodeship: Podlaskie
- County: Białystok
- Gmina: Supraśl

Podsokołda-Gajówka [pɔtsɔˈkɔu̯da ɡaˈjufka] is a village in the administrative district of Gmina Supraśl, within Białystok County, Podlaskie Voivodeship, in north-eastern Poland.
