= Ogrodniczki, Gmina Supraśl =

Ogrodniczki
- Village
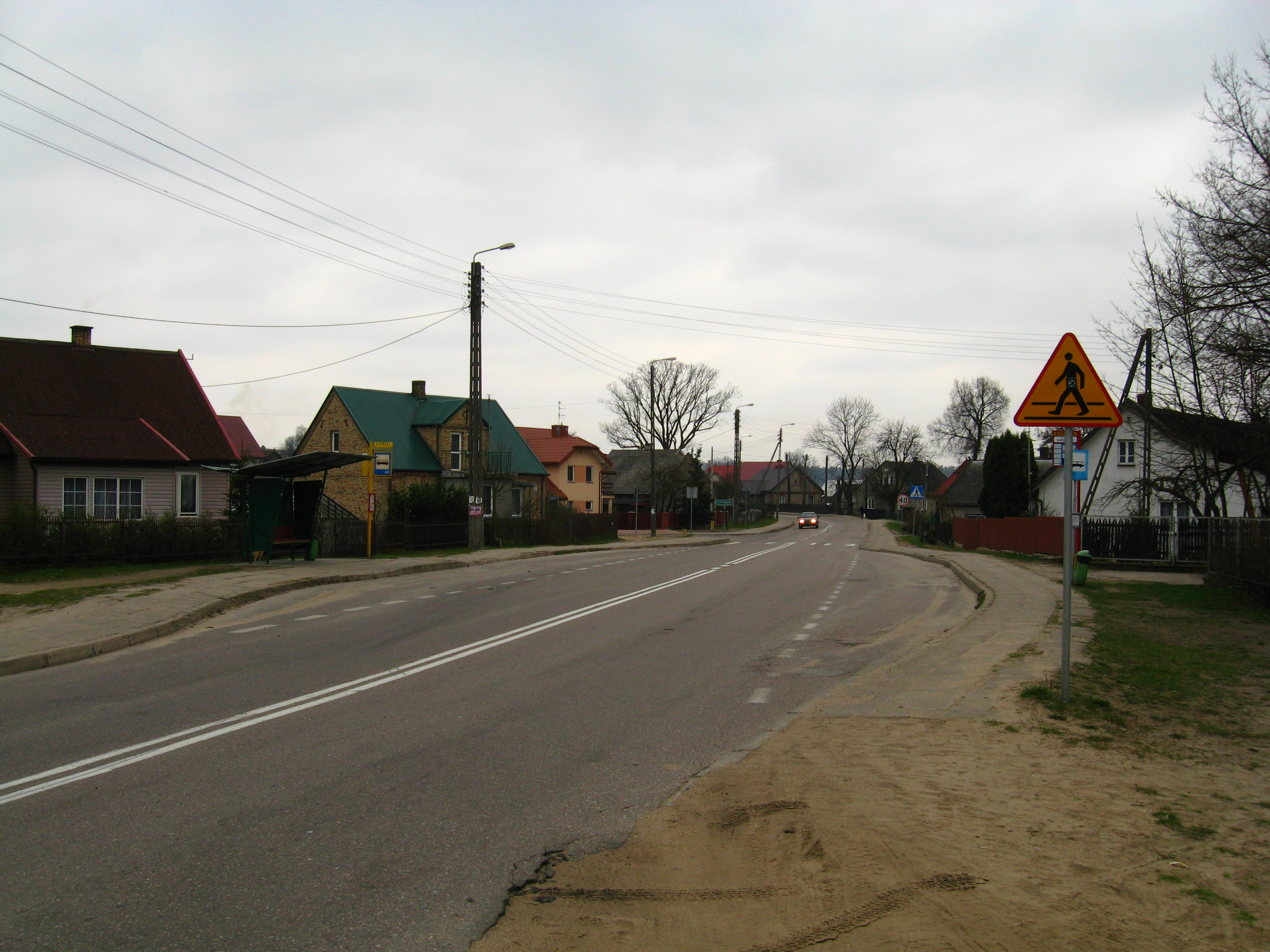
- Main road in the village

- Location within Poland
- Coordinates: 53°11′12″N 23°15′46″E
- Country: Poland
- Voivodeship: Podlaskie
- County: Białystok
- Gmina: Supraśl

Ogrodniczki [ɔɡrɔdˈnit͡ʂki] is a village in the administrative district of Gmina Supraśl, within Białystok County, Podlaskie Voivodeship, in north-eastern Poland. During the Soviet occupation, the 41st Independent Motorized Engineering Battalion stationed in the village.
