= Zaścianki, Podlaskie Voivodeship =

Zaścianki
- Village
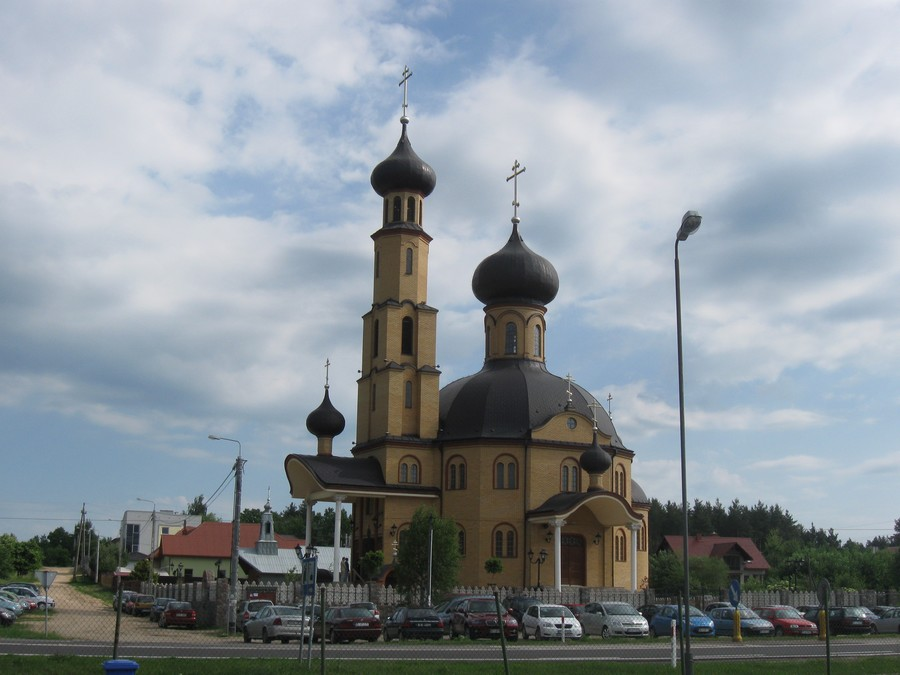
- Eastern Orthodox church

- Location within Poland
- Coordinates: 53°8′N 23°14′E
- Country: Poland
- Voivodeship: Podlaskie
- County: Białystok
- Gmina: Grabówka

Zaścianki [zaɕˈt͡ɕaŋki] is a village in Białystok County, within Podlaskie Voivodeship, in north-eastern Poland. It is the administrative centre of Gmina Grabówka.
