= Konne =

- Settlement
- Location within Poland
- Coordinates: 53°12′31″N 23°26′13″E
- Country: Poland
- Voivodeship: Podlaskie
- County: Białystok
- Gmina: Supraśl

Konne [ˈkɔnnɛ] is a settlement in the administrative district of Gmina Supraśl, within Białystok County, Podlaskie Voivodeship, in north-eastern Poland.
