= Łaźnie =

- Village
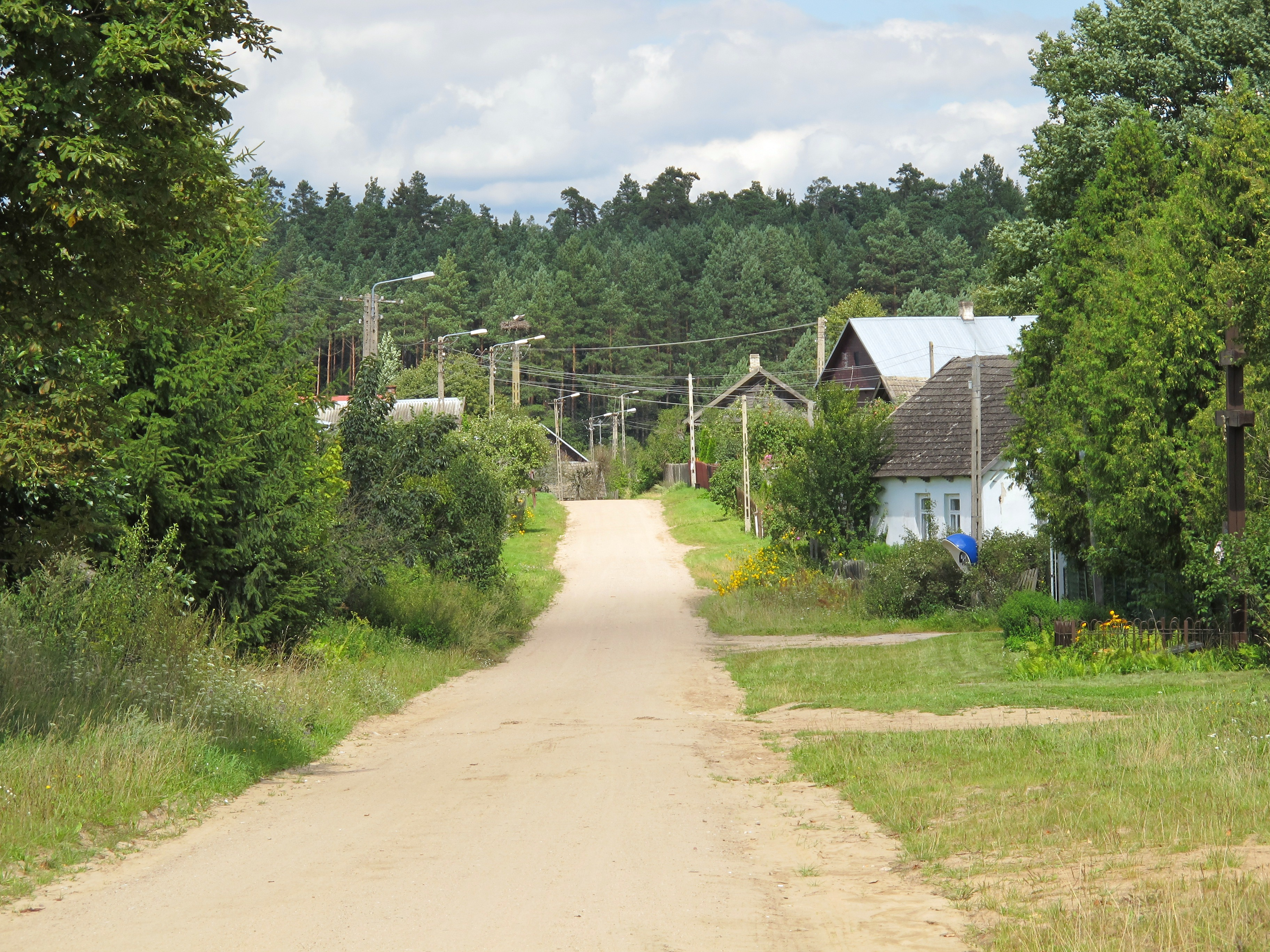

- Location within Poland
- Coordinates: 53°14′N 23°29′E
- Country: Poland
- Voivodeship: Podlaskie
- County: Białystok
- Gmina: Supraśl

Łaźnie [ˈwaʑɲɛ] is a village that is located in the administrative district of Gmina Supraśl, within Białystok County, Podlaskie Voivodeship, in north-eastern Poland.
