= Podsokołda =

- Village
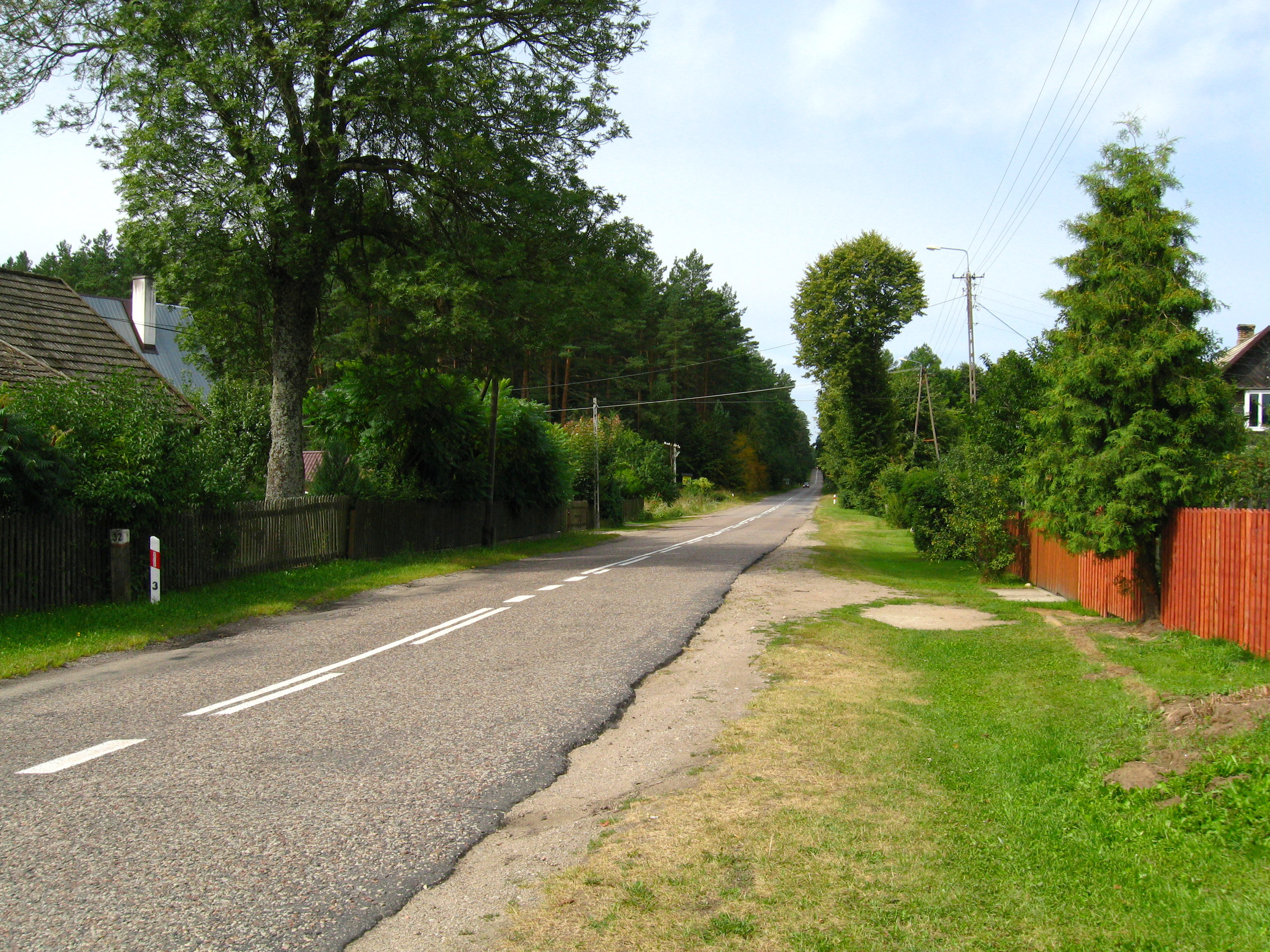

- Location within Poland
- Coordinates: 53°11′N 23°18′E
- Country: Poland
- Voivodeship: Podlaskie
- County: Białystok
- Gmina: Supraśl

Podsokołda [pɔtsɔˈkɔu̯da] is a village in the administrative district of Gmina Supraśl, within Białystok County, Podlaskie Voivodeship, in north-eastern Poland.
