= Czołnowo =

- Settlement
- Location within Poland
- Coordinates: 53°14′16″N 23°24′26″E
- Country: Poland
- Voivodeship: Podlaskie
- County: Białystok
- Gmina: Supraśl

Czołnowo [t͡ʂɔu̯ˈnɔvɔ] is a settlement in the administrative district of Gmina Supraśl, within Białystok County, Podlaskie Voivodeship, in north-eastern Poland.
