= Lubenka =

- Village
- Location within Poland
- Coordinates: 51°53′55″N 23°12′34″E
- Country: Poland
- Voivodeship: Lublin
- County: Biała
- Gmina: Łomazy

Lubenka [luˈbɛŋka] is a village in the administrative district of Gmina Łomazy, within Biała County, Lublin Voivodeship, in eastern Poland.
