= Cegielnia, Białystok County =

Cegielnia
- Village
- Location within Poland
- Coordinates: 53°12′50″N 23°20′57″E
- Country: Poland
- Voivodeship: Podlaskie
- County: Białystok
- Gmina: Supraśl

Cegielnia [t͡sɛˈɡʲɛlɲa] is a village in the administrative district of Gmina Supraśl, within Białystok County, Podlaskie Voivodeship, in north-eastern Poland.
