= Karakule =

- Village
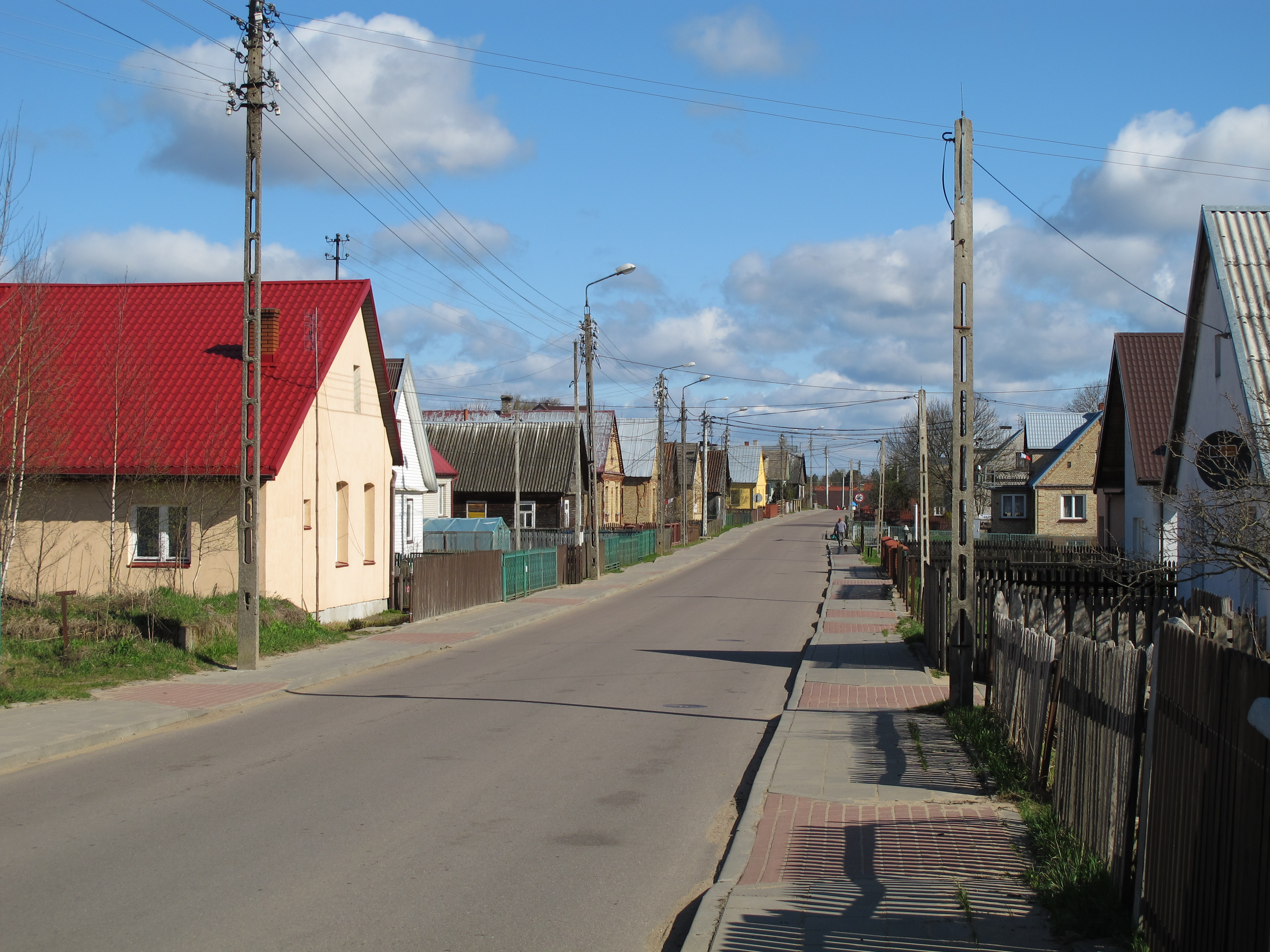
- Street in the village

- Location within Poland
- Coordinates: 53°10′N 23°15′E
- Country: Poland
- Voivodeship: Podlaskie
- County: Białystok
- Gmina: Supraśl
- Population: 450

Karakule [karaˈkulɛ] is a village in the administrative district of Gmina Supraśl, within Białystok County, Podlaskie Voivodeship, in north-eastern Poland.
