= Grabówka, Białystok County =

Grabówka
- Village
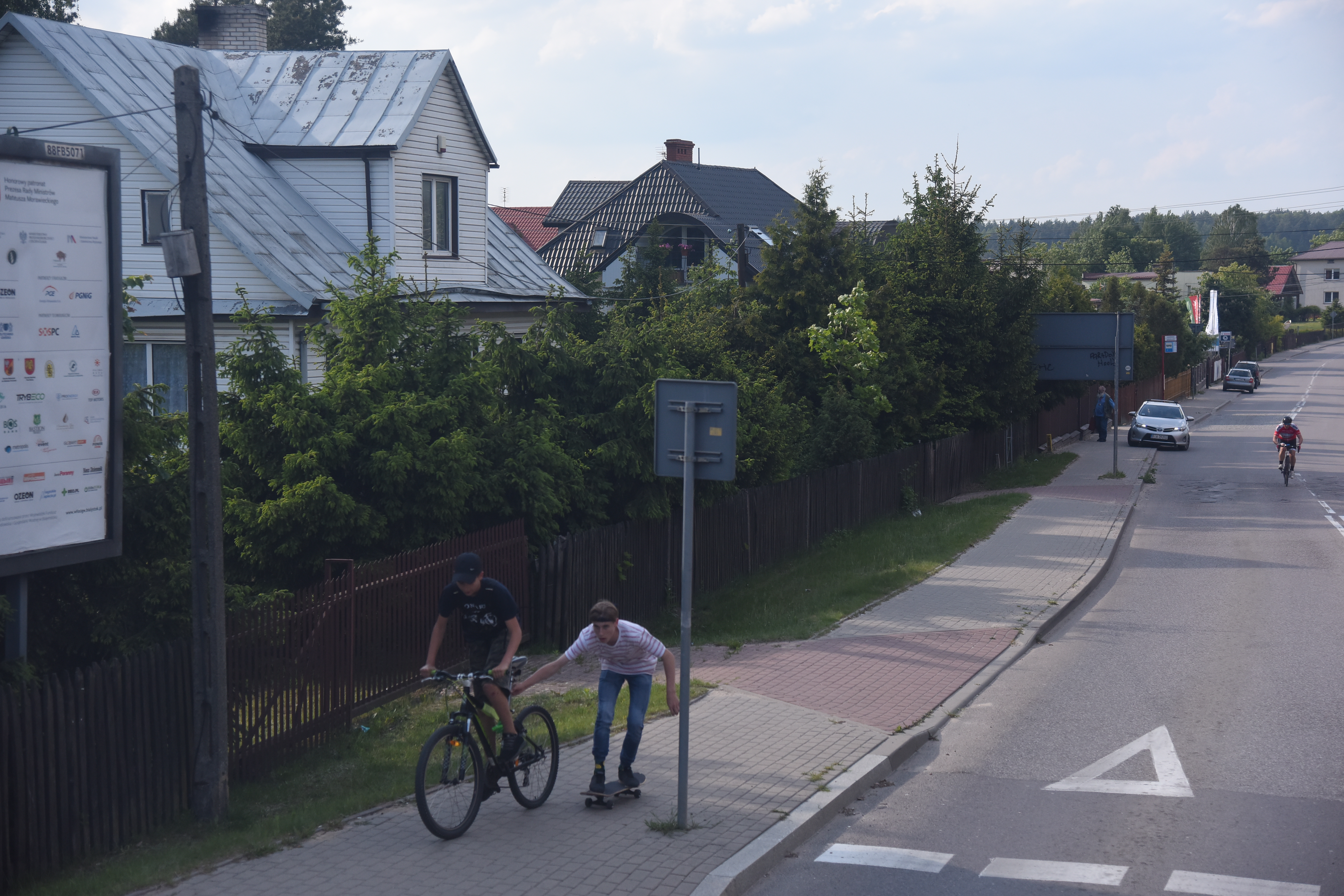
- View of Grabówka in May 2019

- Location within Poland
- Coordinates: 53°7′35″N 23°15′29″E
- Country: Poland
- Voivodeship: Podlaskie
- County: Białystok
- Gmina: Grabówka
- Population: 1,191

Grabówka [ɡraˈbufka] is a village in Podlaskie Voivodeship, Poland, within Gmina Grabówka, Białystok County. It is served by Białystok's bus system.
