= Międzyrzecze, Podlaskie Voivodeship =

Międzyrzecze
- Village
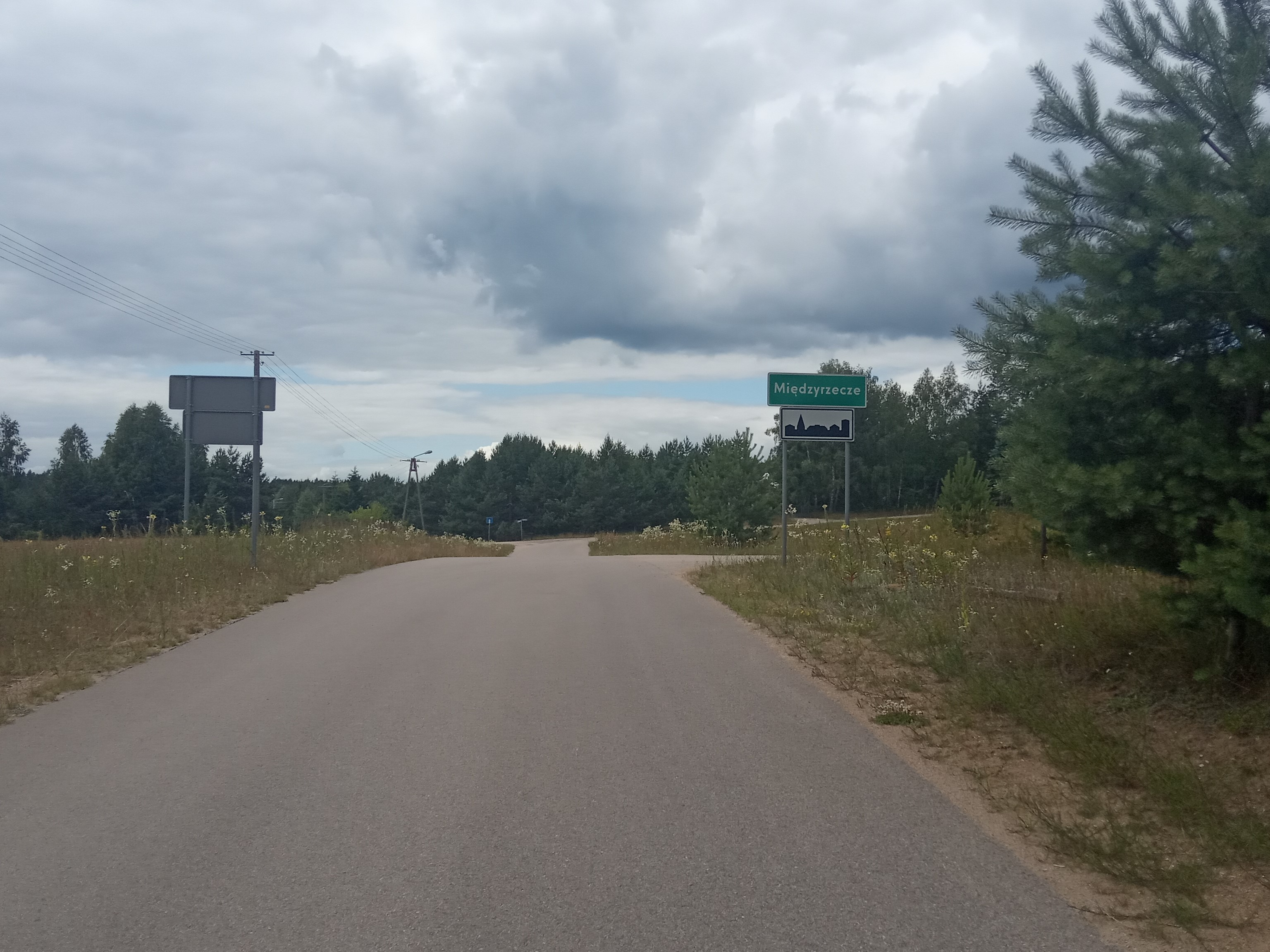

- Location within Poland
- Coordinates: 53°15′43″N 23°27′45″E
- Country: Poland
- Voivodeship: Podlaskie
- County: Białystok
- Gmina: Supraśl
- Population: 80

Międzyrzecze [mjɛnd͡zɨˈʐɛt͡ʂɛ] is a village in the administrative district of Gmina Supraśl, within Białystok County, Podlaskie Voivodeship, in north-eastern Poland.
