= Henrykowo, Podlaskie Voivodeship =

Henrykowo
- Village
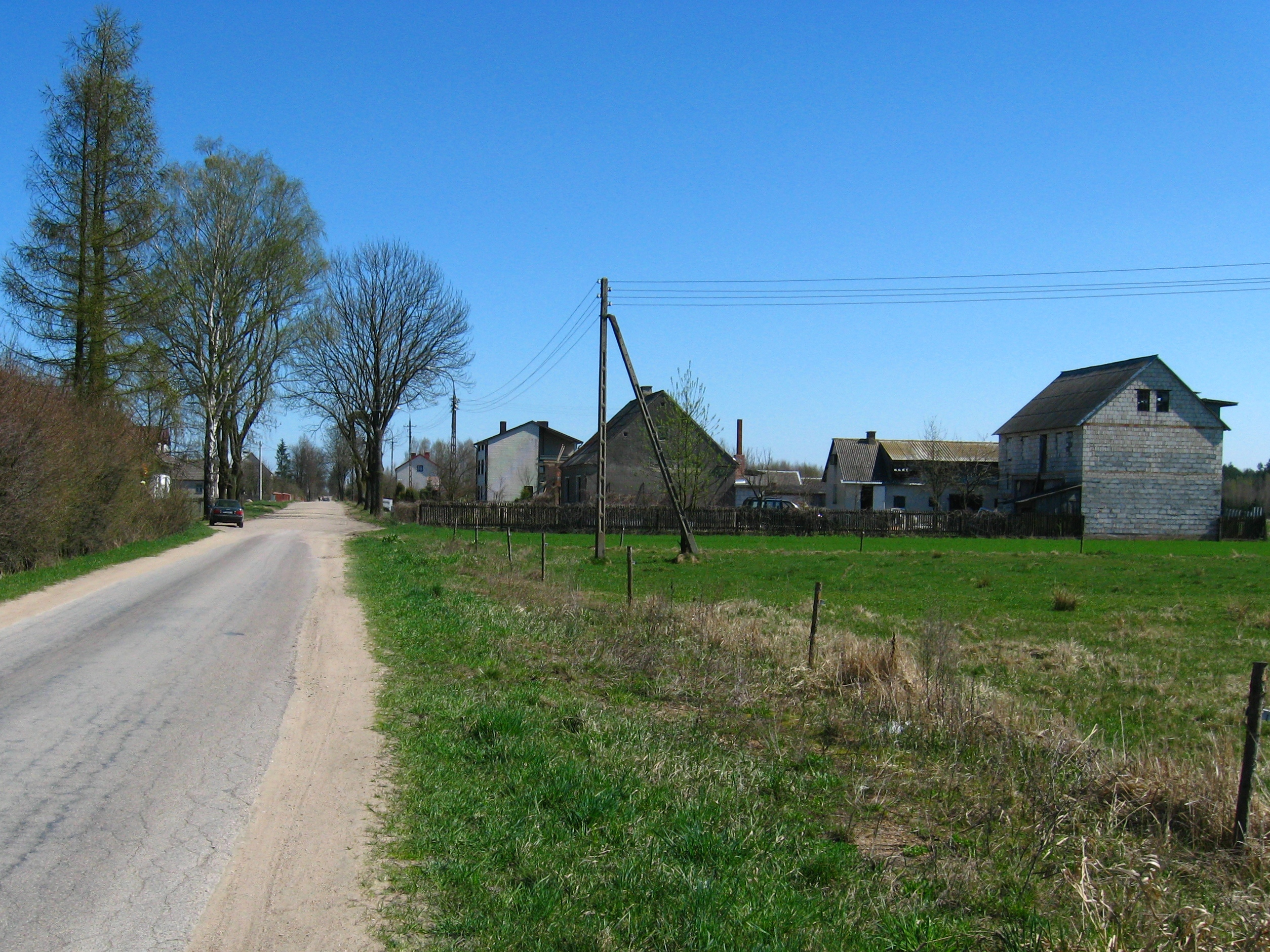

- Location within Poland
- Coordinates: 53°6′15″N 23°17′39″E
- Country: Poland
- Voivodeship: Podlaskie
- County: Białystok
- Gmina: Grabówka

Henrykowo ([xɛnrɨˈkɔvɔ]) is a village in Podlaskie Voivodeship, Poland, within Gmina Grabówka, Białystok County.
