= Sowlany =

- Village
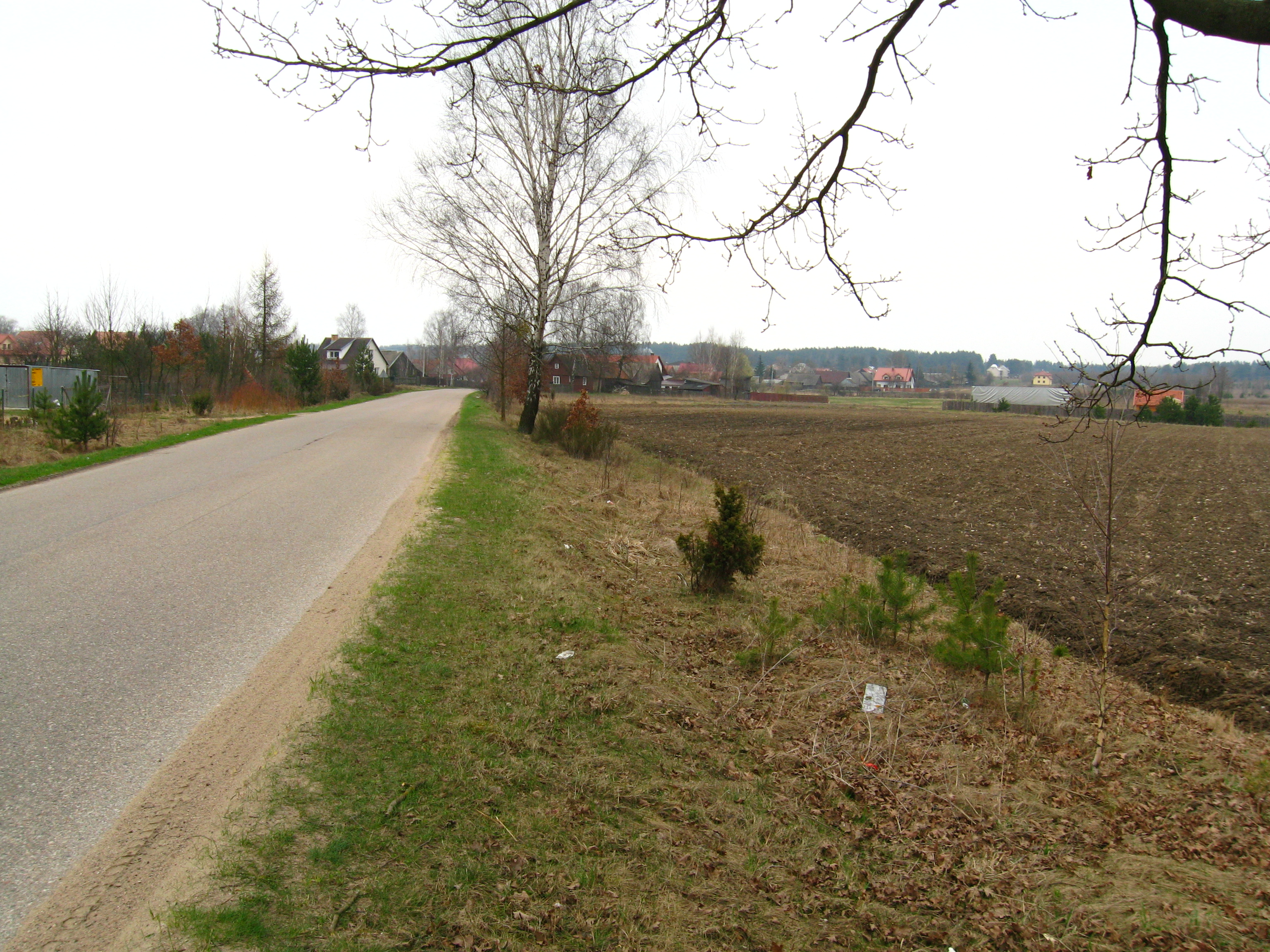
- Main road to Sowlany

- Location within Poland
- Coordinates: 53°10′N 23°15′E
- Country: Poland
- Voivodeship: Podlaskie
- County: Białystok
- Gmina: Grabówka

Sowlany ([sɔˈvlanɨ]) is a village in Podlaskie Voivodeship, Poland, within Gmina Grabówka, Białystok County
