= Stary Majdan, Podlaskie Voivodeship =

Stary Majdan
- Village
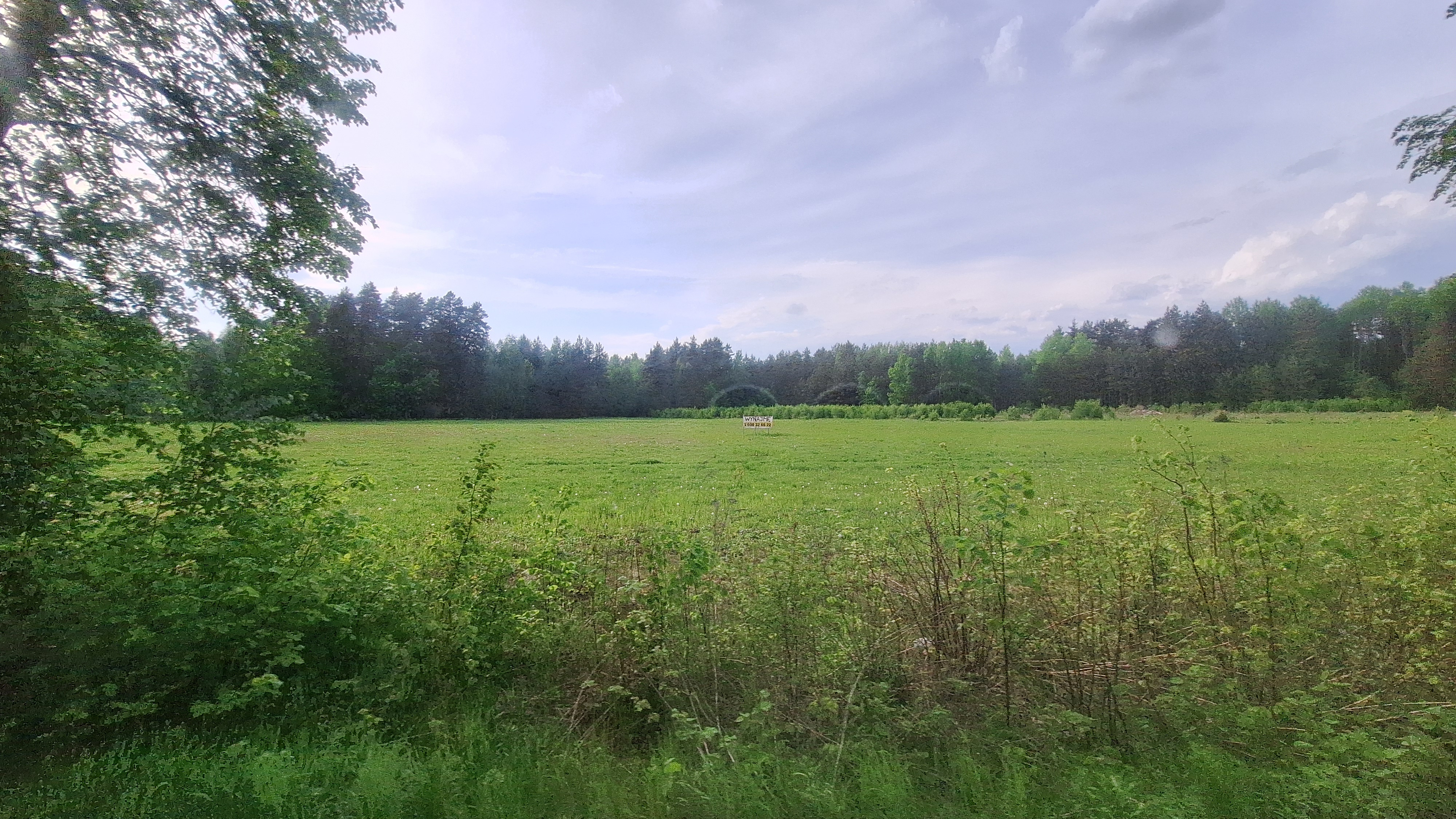

- Location within Poland
- Coordinates: 53°09′55″N 23°14′59″E
- Country: Poland
- Voivodeship: Podlaskie
- County: Białystok
- Gmina: Grabówka

Stary Majdan (Polish pronunciation: [ˈstarɨ ˈmajdan]) is a village in the administrative district of Gmina Grabówka, within Białystok County, Podlaskie Voivodeship, in north-eastern Poland. Until January 2025 it was part of Gmina Supraśl.
