= Kopytnik, Lublin Voivodeship =

Kopytnik
- Village
- Location within Poland
- Coordinates: 51°51′N 23°17′E
- Country: Poland
- Voivodeship: Lublin
- County: Biała
- Gmina: Łomazy

Kopytnik [kɔˈpɨtɲik] is a village in the administrative district of Gmina Łomazy, within Biała County, Lublin Voivodeship, in eastern Poland.

== See also ==
- List of cities and towns in Poland
