= Krasne-Gajówka =

Village in Gmina Supraśl, Poland

- Village
- Location within Poland
- Coordinates: 53°11′02″N 23°17′09″E
- Country: Poland
- Voivodeship: Podlaskie
- County: Białystok
- Gmina: Supraśl

Krasne-Gajówka [ˈkrasnɛ ɡaˈjufka] is a village in the administrative district of Gmina Supraśl, within Białystok County, Podlaskie Voivodeship, in north-eastern Poland.
