= Pólko, Gmina Supraśl =

Village in Gmina Supraśl, Poland

Pólko
- Village
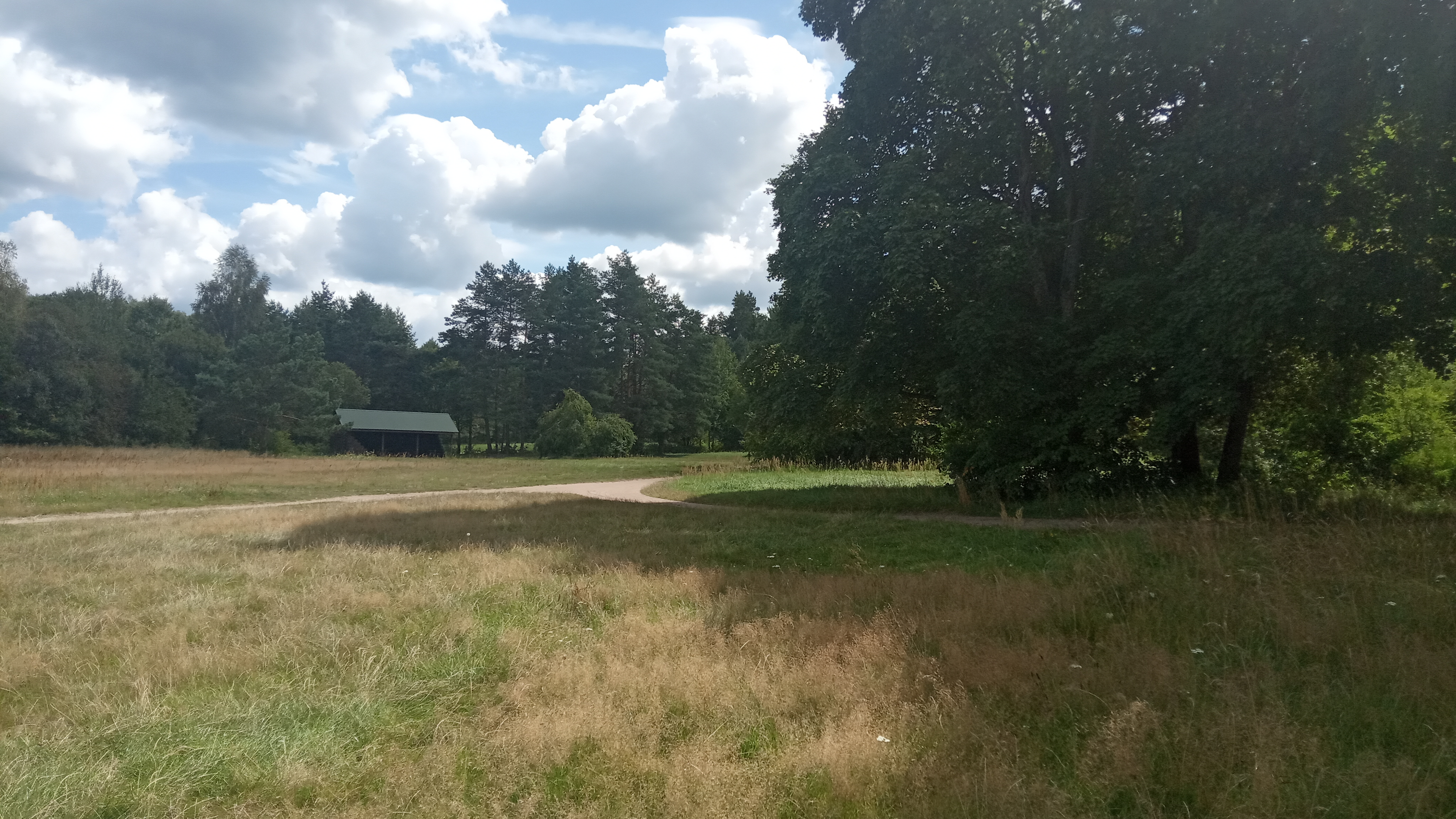

- Location within Poland
- Coordinates: 53°13′09″N 23°17′55″E
- Country: Poland
- Voivodeship: Podlaskie
- County: Białystok
- Gmina: Supraśl

Pólko [ˈpulkɔ] is a village in the administrative district of Gmina Supraśl, within Białystok County, Podlaskie Voivodeship, in north-eastern Poland.
