= Sokołda =

- Village
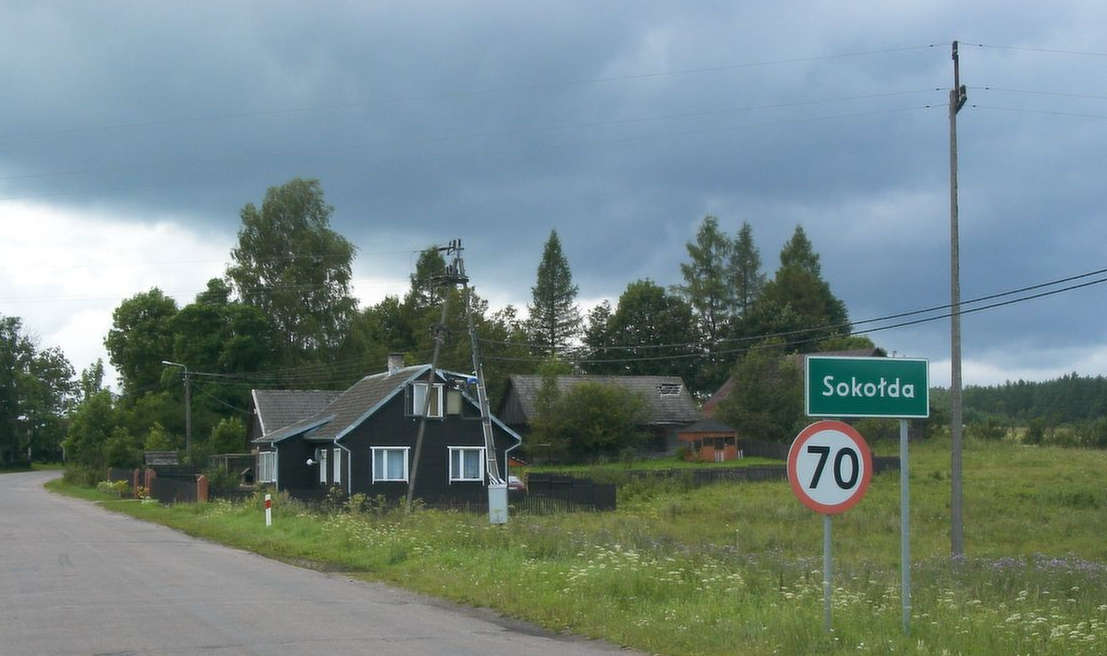
- Sokołda in August 2004

- Location within Poland
- Coordinates: 53°15′N 23°28′E
- Country: Poland
- Voivodeship: Podlaskie
- County: Białystok
- Gmina: Supraśl

Sokołda [sɔˈkɔu̯da] is a village in the administrative district of Gmina Supraśl, within Białystok County, Podlaskie Voivodeship, in north-eastern Poland.
