= Cieliczanka =

- Village
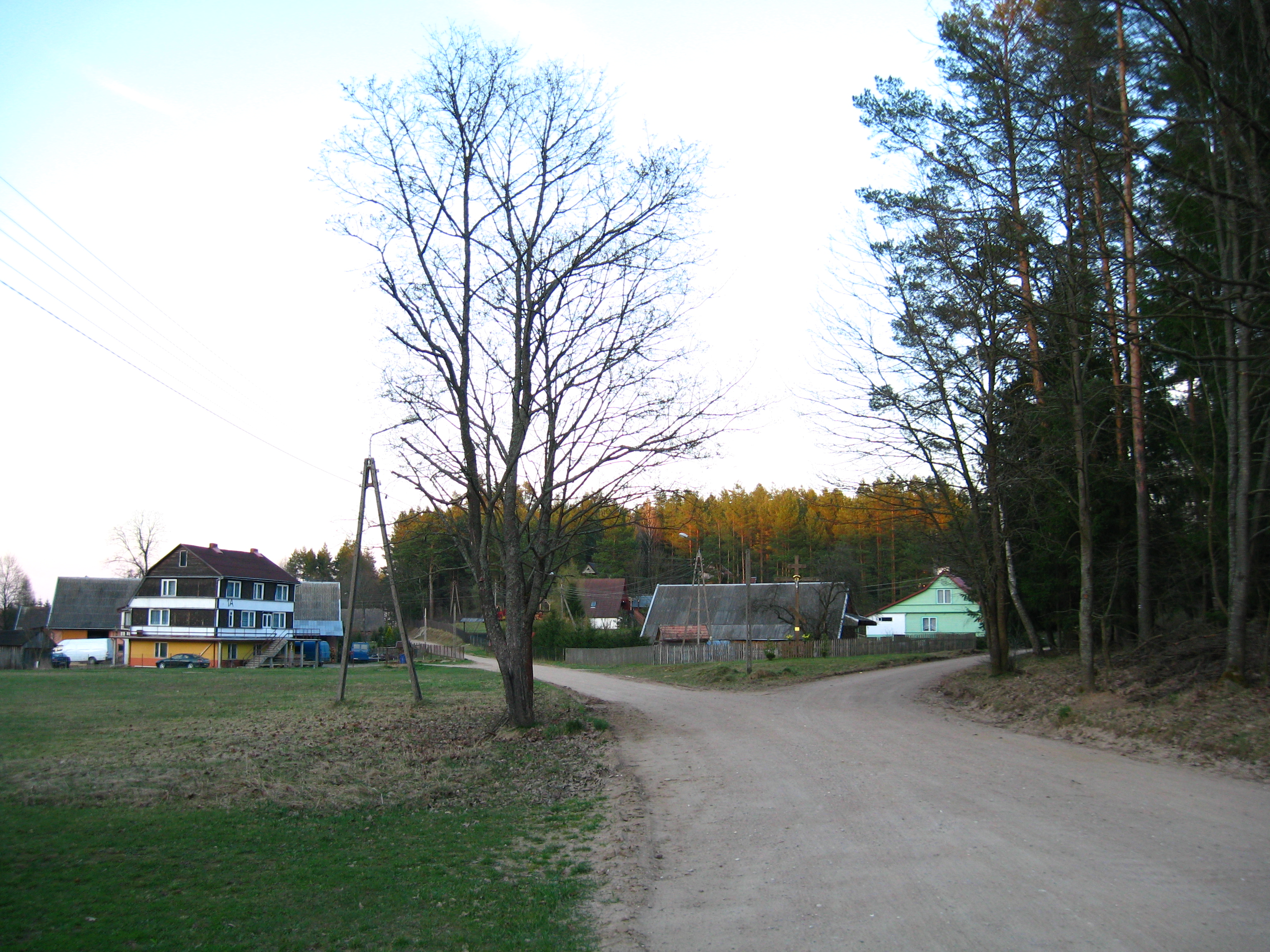

- Location within Poland
- Coordinates: 53°12′N 23°24′E
- Country: Poland
- Voivodeship: Podlaskie
- County: Białystok
- Gmina: Supraśl

Cieliczanka [t͡ɕɛliˈt͡ʂanka] is a village in the administrative district of Gmina Supraśl, within Białystok County, Podlaskie Voivodeship, in north-eastern Poland.
