= Kopna Góra =

- Village
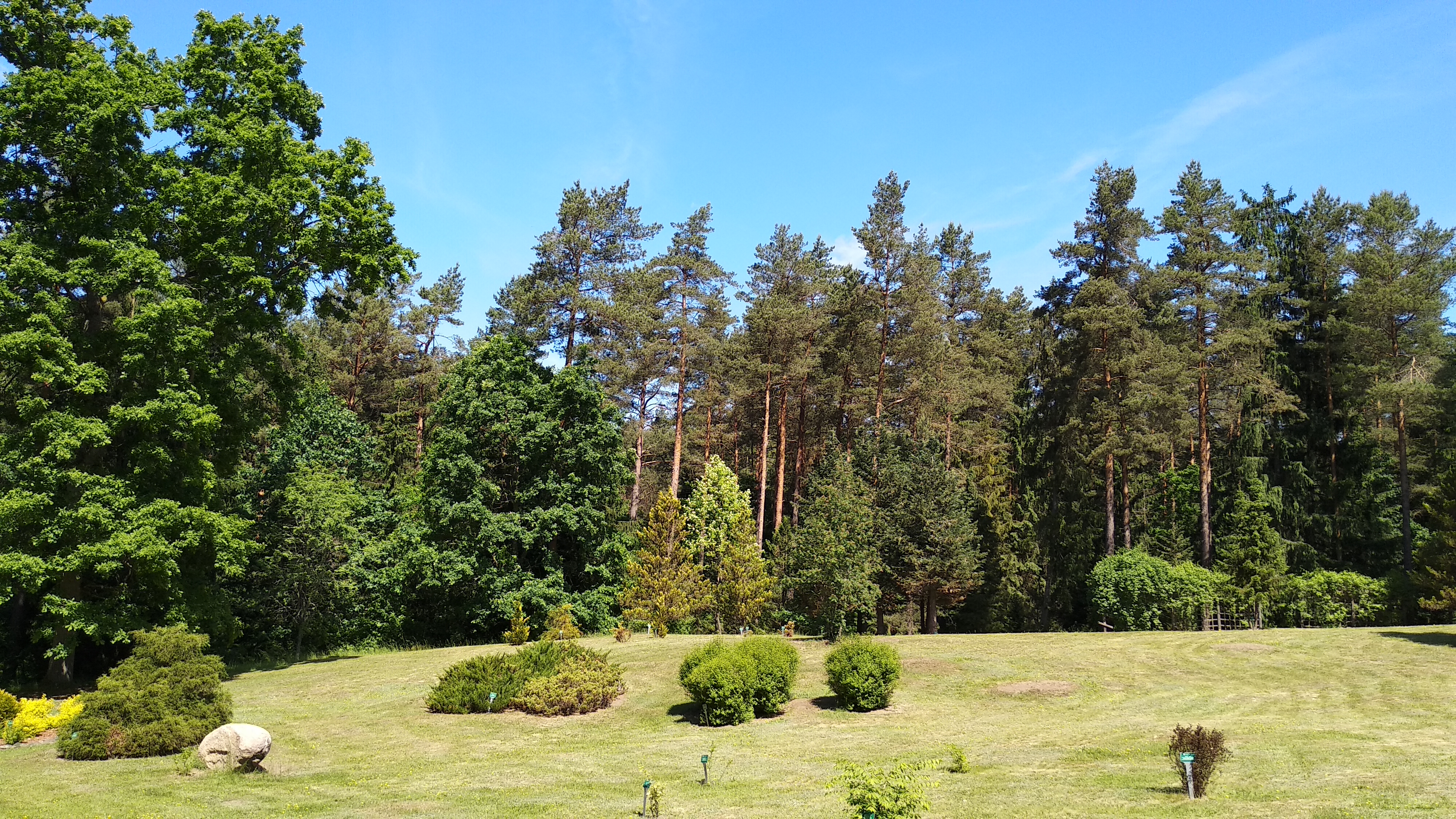
- Arboretum in Kopna Góra

- Location within Poland
- Coordinates: 53°15′N 23°28′E
- Country: Poland
- Voivodeship: Podlaskie
- County: Białystok
- Gmina: Supraśl
- Time zone: UTC+1 (CET)
  - Summer (DST): UTC+2 (CEST)
- Area code: +48 85
- Vehicle registration: BIA

Kopna Góra [ˈkɔpna ˈɡura] is a village in the administrative district of Gmina Supraśl, within Białystok County, Podlaskie Voivodeship, in north-eastern Poland.

An arboretum and a cemetery of Polish November insurgents of 1831 are located in Kopna Góra.

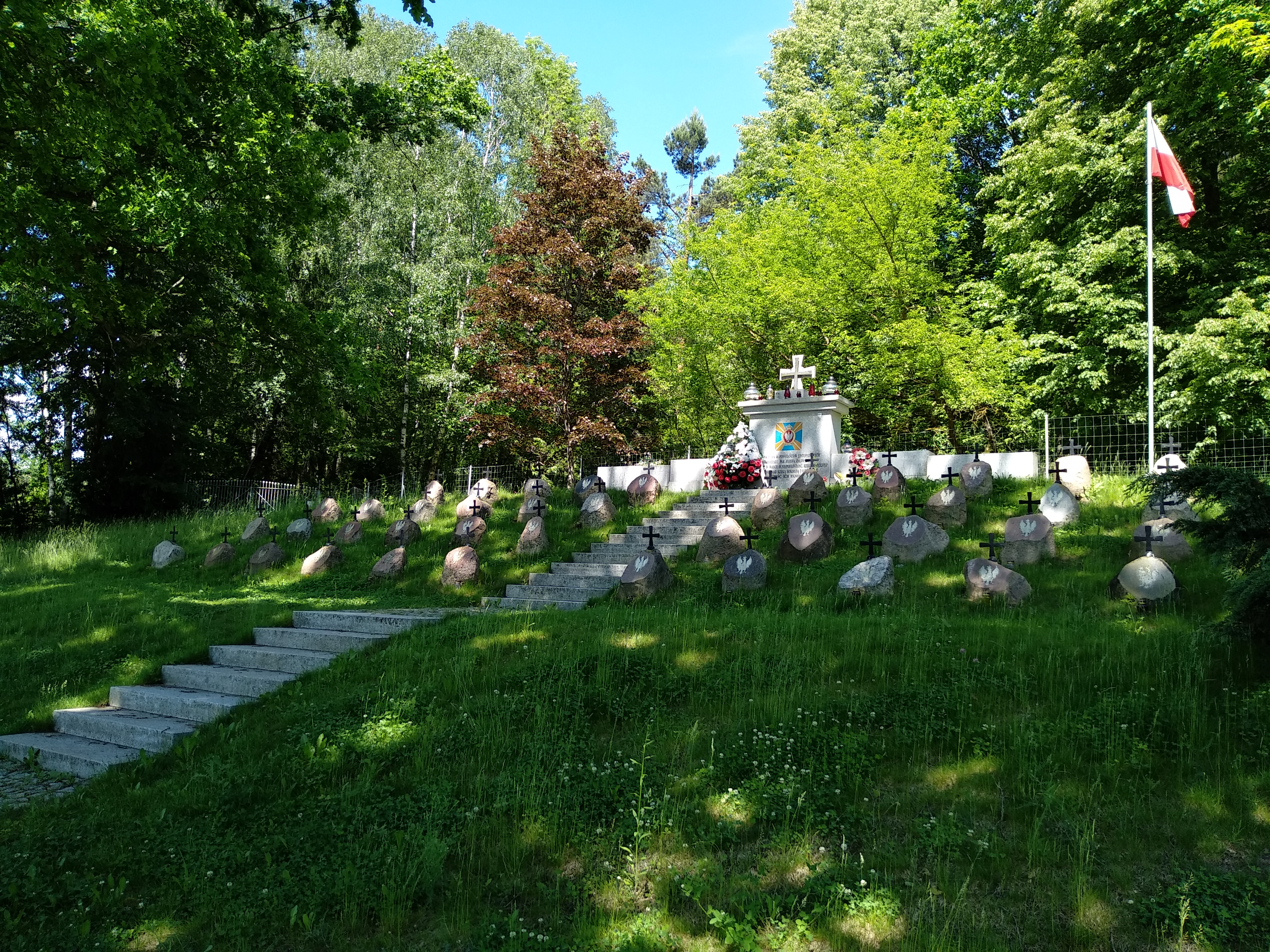
Cemetery of Polish November insurgents of 1831
