= Jusaki-Zarzeka =

- Village
- Location within Poland
- Coordinates: 51°53′2″N 23°10′34″E
- Country: Poland
- Voivodeship: Lublin
- County: Biała
- Gmina: Łomazy

Jusaki-Zarzeka [juˈsakʲi zaˈʐɛka] is a village in the administrative district of Gmina Łomazy, within Biała County, Lublin Voivodeship, in eastern Poland.
