= Ciasne =

- Village
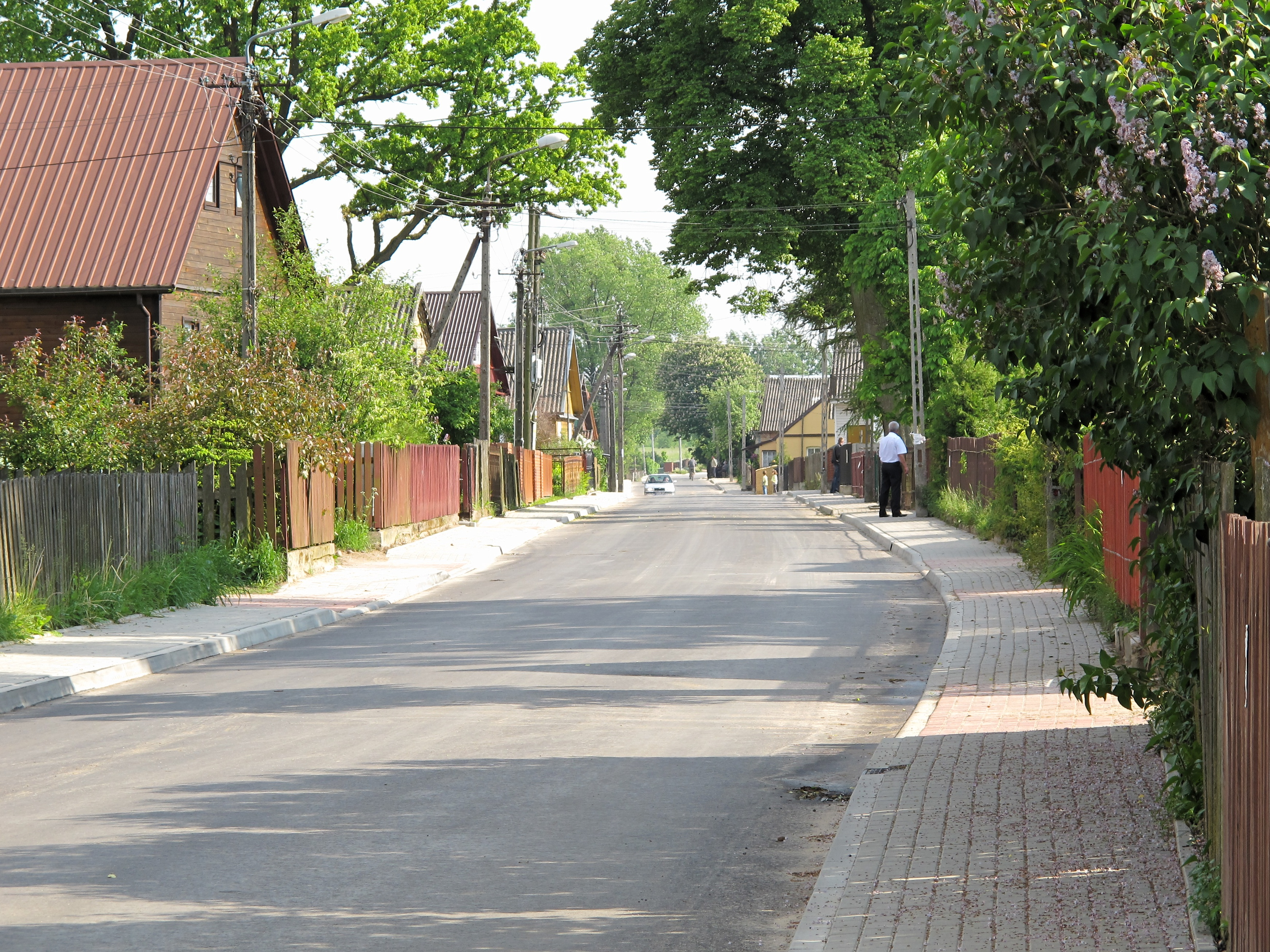

- Location within Poland
- Coordinates: 53°11′N 23°18′E
- Country: Poland
- Voivodeship: Podlaskie
- County: Białystok
- Gmina: Supraśl
- Population (approx.): 300

Ciasne [ˈt͡ɕasnɛ] is a village in the administrative district of Gmina Supraśl, within Białystok County, Podlaskie Voivodeship, in north-eastern Poland.
