= Szymanowo, Lublin Voivodeship =

Szymanowo
- Village
- Location within Poland
- Coordinates: 51°53′38″N 23°11′37″E
- Country: Poland
- Voivodeship: Lublin
- County: Biała
- Gmina: Łomazy
- Time zone: UTC+1 (CET)
  - Summer (DST): UTC+2 (CEST)

Szymanowo (Polish pronunciation: [ʂɨmaˈnɔvɔ]) is a village in the administrative district of Gmina Łomazy, within Biała County, Lublin Voivodeship, in eastern Poland.

== History ==
Nine Polish citizens were murdered by Nazi Germany in the village during World War II.
