= Zdroje, Gmina Supraśl =

Zdroje
- Village
- Location within Poland
- Coordinates: 53°00′01″N 23°14′06″E
- Country: Poland
- Voivodeship: Podlaskie
- County: Białystok
- Gmina: Supraśl

Zdroje [ˈzdrɔjɛ] is a village in the administrative district of Gmina Supraśl, within Białystok County, Podlaskie Voivodeship, in north-eastern Poland.
