= Zacisze, Gmina Supraśl =

Zacisze
- Settlement
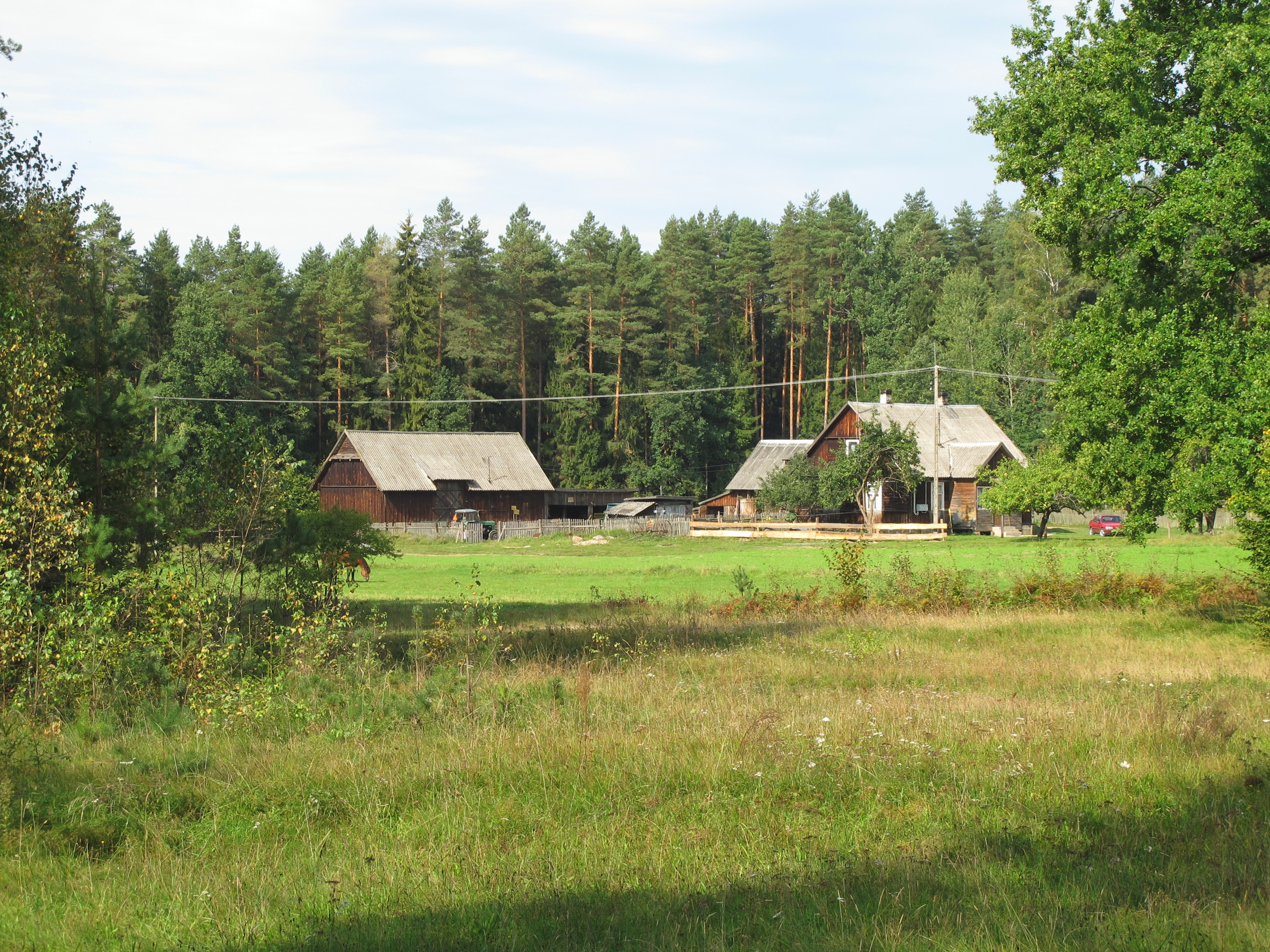

- Location within Poland
- Coordinates: 53°15′6″N 23°21′35″E
- Country: Poland
- Voivodeship: Podlaskie
- County: Białystok
- Gmina: Supraśl

Zacisze [zaˈt͡ɕiʂɛ] is a settlement in the administrative district of Gmina Supraśl, within Białystok County, Podlaskie Voivodeship, in north-eastern Poland.
