= Gmina Łomazy =

Gmina Łomazy Łomazy Commune
- Gmina
- Coat of arms
- Interactive map of Gmina Łomazy
- Coordinates (Łomazy): 51°54′N 23°10′E
- Country: Poland
- Voivodeship: Lublin
- County: Biała County
- Seat: Łomazy

Area
  - Total: 200.43 km^{2} (77.39 sq mi)

Population (2014)
  - Total: 5,109
  - Density: 25.49/km^{2} (66.02/sq mi)
- Website: http://lomazy-gmina.pl

Gmina Łomazy is a rural gmina (administrative district) in Biała County, Lublin Voivodeship, in eastern Poland. Its seat is the village of Łomazy, which lies approximately 16 kilometres (10 mi) south of Biała Podlaska and 84 km (52 mi) north-east of the regional capital Lublin.

The gmina covers an area of 200.43 square kilometres (77.4 sq mi), and as of 2006 its total population is 5,431 (5,109 in 2014).

== Villages ==
Gmina Łomazy contains the villages and tatar settlements from 1679 of Bielany, Burwin, Dubów, Huszcza Druga, Huszcza Pierwsza, Jusaki-Zarzeka, Kopytnik, Korczówka, Koszoły, Kozły, Krasówka, Łomazy, Lubenka, Stasiówka, Studzianka, Szymanowo, Wola Dubowska and Wólka Korczowska.

== Neighbouring gminas ==
Gmina Łomazy is bordered by the gminas of Biała Podlaska, Drelów, Komarówka Podlaska, Piszczac, Rossosz, Sosnówka, Tuczna and Wisznice.
