= Jałówka, Gmina Supraśl =

Jałówka
- Village
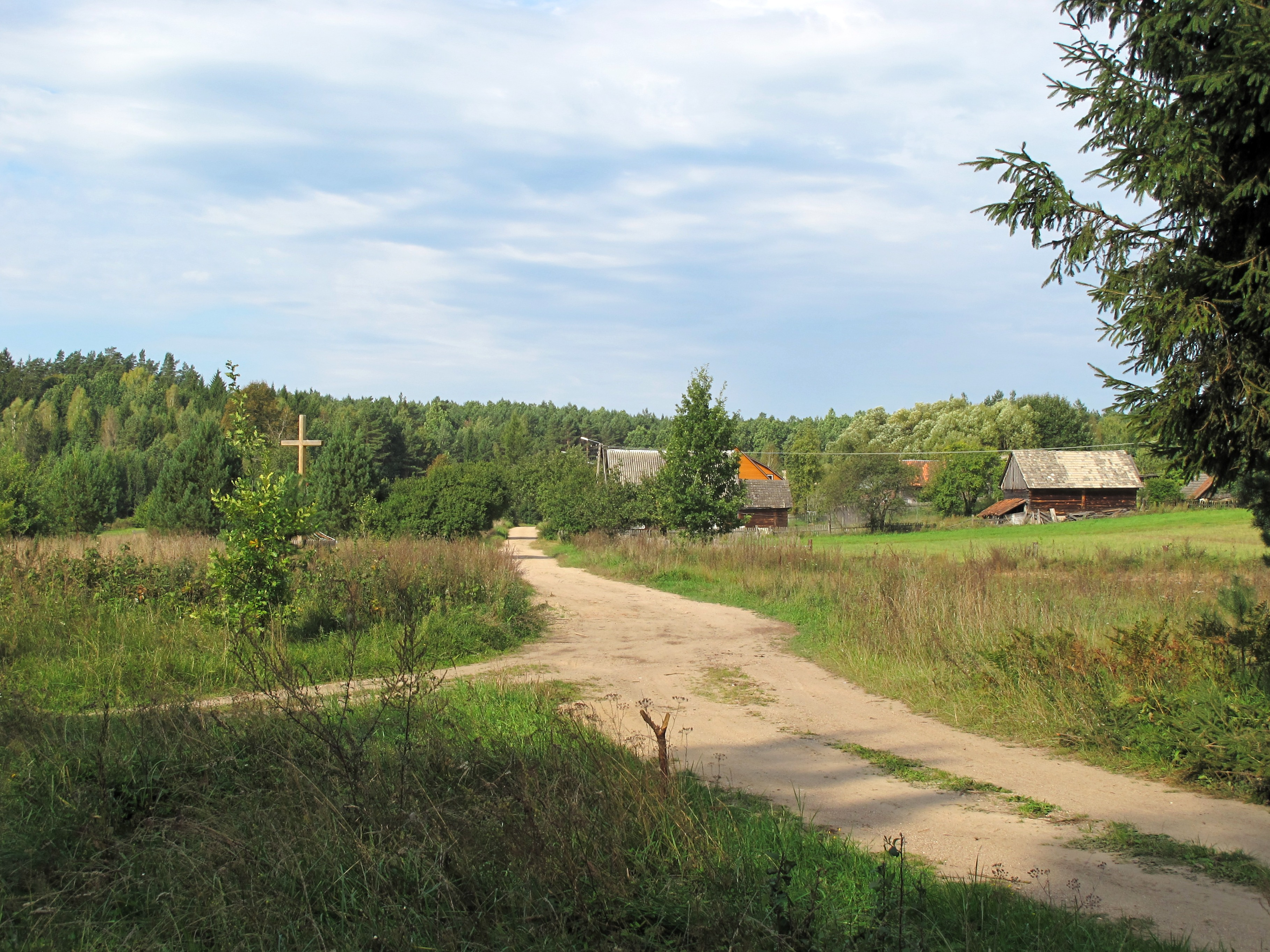

- Location within Poland
- Coordinates: 53°06′55″N 23°17′09″E
- Country: Poland
- Voivodeship: Podlaskie
- County: Białystok
- Gmina: Supraśl

Jałówka [jaˈwufka] is a village in the administrative district of Gmina Supraśl, within Białystok County, Podlaskie Voivodeship, in north-eastern Poland.
