= Huszcza Druga =

- Village
- Location within Poland
- Coordinates: 51°52′3″N 23°17′21″E
- Country: Poland
- Voivodeship: Lublin
- County: Biała
- Gmina: Łomazy

Huszcza Druga [ˈxuʂt͡ʂa ˈdruɡa] is a village in the administrative district of Gmina Łomazy, within Biała County, Lublin Voivodeship, in eastern Poland.
