= Burwin =

- Village
- Location within Poland
- Coordinates: 51°56′N 23°4′E
- Country: Poland
- Voivodeship: Lublin
- County: Biała
- Gmina: Łomazy

Burwin (Polish pronunciation: [ˈburvin]) is a village in the administrative district of Gmina Łomazy, within Biała County, Lublin Voivodeship, in eastern Poland.
