= Kozły, Lublin Voivodeship =

Kozły
- Village
- Location within Poland
- Coordinates: 51°54′N 23°4′E
- Country: Poland
- Voivodeship: Lublin
- County: Biała
- Gmina: Łomazy
- Time zone: UTC+1 (CET)
  - Summer (DST): UTC+2 (CEST)

Kozły [ˈkɔzwɨ] is a village in the administrative district of Gmina Łomazy, within Biała County, Lublin Voivodeship, in eastern Poland.

== History ==
Eight Polish citizens were murdered by Nazi Germany in the village during World War II.
