= Gmina Supraśl =

Gmina Supraśl Supraśl Commune
- Gmina
- Flag Coat of arms

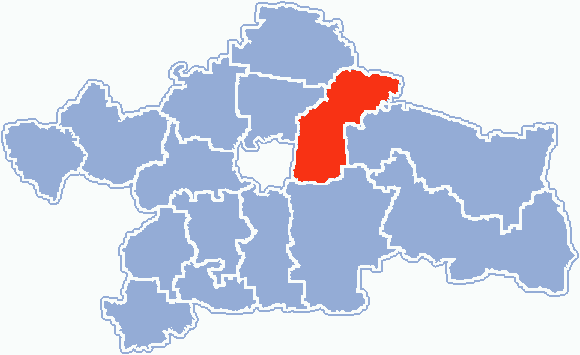
- Location within Białystok County
- Coordinates (Supraśl): 53°13′N 23°20′E
- Country: Poland
- Voivodeship: Podlaskie
- County: Białystok County
- Seat: Supraśl

Area
  - Total: 187.96 km^{2} (72.57 sq mi)

Population (2006)
  - Total: 12,780
  - Density: 67.99/km^{2} (176.1/sq mi)
  - Urban: 4,578
  - Rural: 8,202
- Time zone: UTC+1 (CET)
  - Summer (DST): UTC+2 (CEST)
- Website: https://www.suprasl.pl/

Gmina Supraśl is an urban-rural gmina (administrative district) in Białystok County, Podlaskie Voivodeship, in north-eastern Poland. Its seat is the town of Supraśl, which lies approximately 16 kilometres (10 mi) north-east of the regional capital Białystok.

The gmina covers an area of 187.96 square kilometres (72.6 sq mi), and as of 2006 its total population is 12,780 (out of which the population of Supraśl amounts to 4,578, and the population of the rural part of the gmina is 8,202).

The gmina contains part of the protected area called Knyszyń Forest Landscape Park.

== Villages ==
Apart from the town of Supraśl, Gmina Supraśl contains the villages and settlements of Cegielnia, Ciasne, Cieliczanka, Czołnowo, Grabówka-Kolonia, Izoby, Jałówka, Karakule, Komosa, Konne, Kopna Góra, Kozły, Krasne, Krasne-Gajówka, Krasny Las, Krzemienne, Łaźnie, Majówka, Międzyrzecze, Ogrodniczki, Pieczonka, Podjałówka, Podłaźnie, Podsokołda, Podsokołda-Gajówka, Pólko, Sadowy Stok, Sobolewo-Kolonia, Sokołda, Stary Majdan, Surażkowo, Turo, Turo-Gajówka, Woronicze, Zacisze, Zdroje and Zielona.

== Neighbouring gminas ==
Gmina Supraśl is bordered by the city of Białystok and by the gminas of Czarna Białostocka, Gródek, Sokółka, Szudziałowo, Wasilków and Zabłudów.
