= Operation Bielany =

World War II operation by the Polish resistance

- Part of the Second World War
Date	3–4 May 1944
Location	Bielany Aerodrome near Warsaw, General Government 52°17′34″N 20°56′24″E
Result	Polish victory

Belligerents
Polish Underground State: Home Army	Germany: General Government

Units involved
Home Army: Directorate of Diversion; Jan Special Divisions	(Nazi Germany) Luftwaffe

Strength
17 people	Unknown

Casualties and losses
None	8 aircraft destroyed

Operation Bielany (Polish: [bjɛˈlanɘ̟]; Polish: Akcja Bielany) was a sabotage operation during the Second World War, organized by the Directorate of Diversion of the Home Army. At night of 3 and 4 May 1944, a small partisan division had set explosives at the Bielany Aerodrome, then used as a Luftwaffe base, successfully destroying eight aircraft, and retreating without suffering casualties.

== Background ==
The construction of the Bielany Aerodrome begun in 1938. It was located between villages of Młociny, and Wawrzyszew, within present boundaries of Warsaw, in the district of Bielany. In September 1939, the unfinished aerodrome was captured by German forces during the Invasion of Poland. During the occupation, the aerodrome became a Luftwaffe base, and was furtherly expanded.

== Operation ==
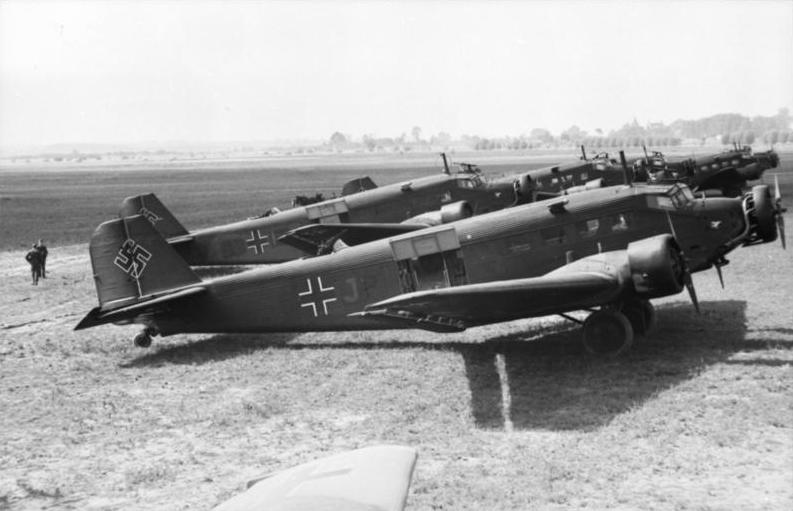
An example of Junkers Ju 52/3m transport aircraft

At night of 3 and 4 May, a 17-person partisan team of the Jan Special Divisions of the Home Army, had sneaked into the Bielany Aerodrome. There, they had planted small plastic explosives on five Junkers Ju 52/3m transport aircraft. The bombs were placed near the fuel tanks, to intensify the explosion. Moments before the explosives were set off, the partisans were detected by a patrol unit, with which, they engaged in the shooting.

The explosion had destroyed all five planes, and set a fire which caused another three planes to explode. This caused a panic on the airdrome, with staff believing it to be an Allied airstrike. They launched flares, and an alarm was raised in nearby Warsaw. The partisans managed to retreat without enduring casualties.
