= Kozły, Białystok County =

Kozły
- Village
- Location within Poland
- Coordinates: 53°15′50″N 23°28′05″E
- Country: Poland
- Voivodeship: Podlaskie
- County: Białystok
- Gmina: Supraśl

Kozły [ˈkɔzwɨ] is a village in the administrative district of Gmina Supraśl, within Białystok County, Podlaskie Voivodeship, in north-eastern Poland.
