= Sadowy Stok =

- Settlement
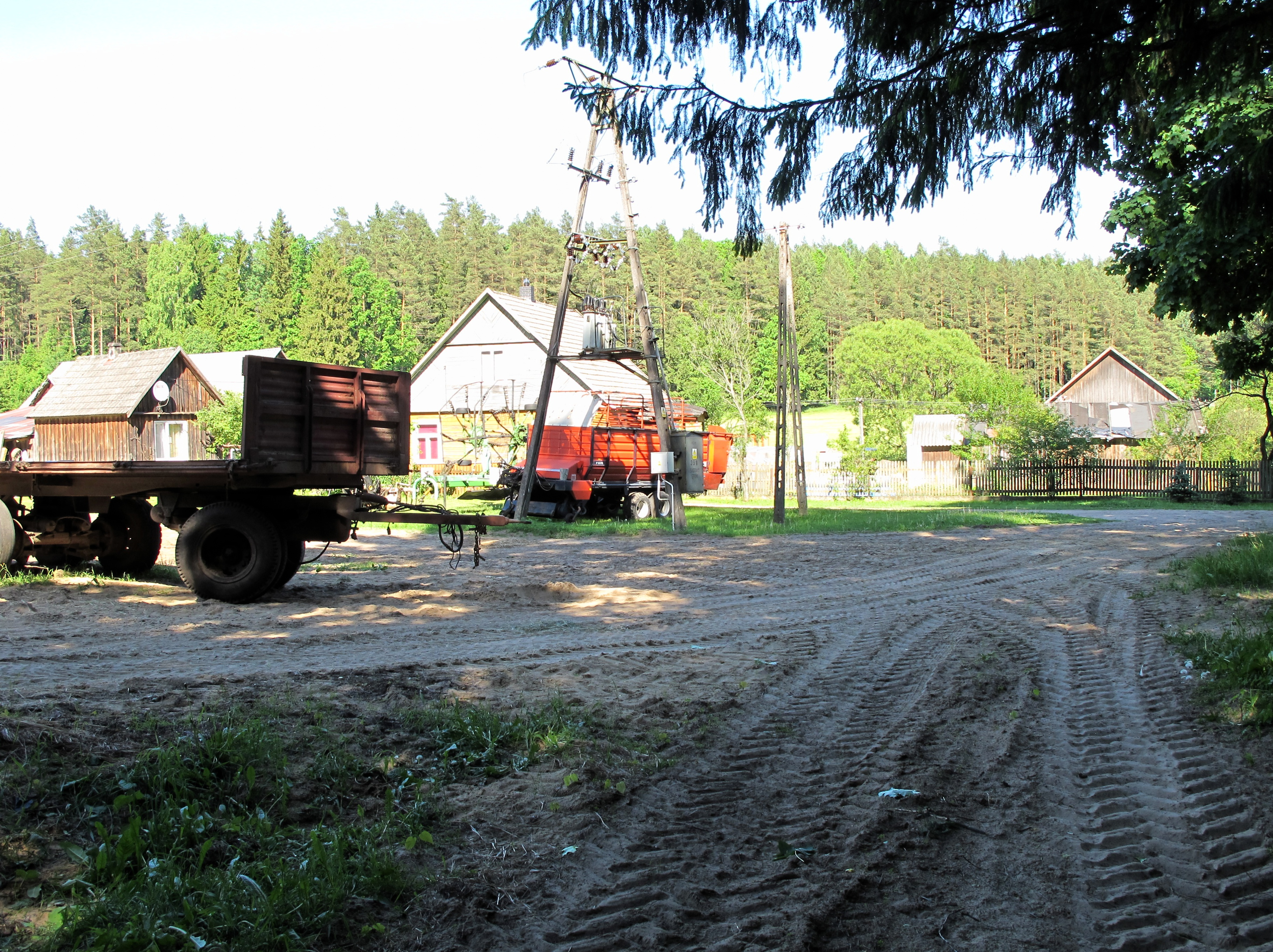

- Location within Poland
- Coordinates: 53°14′50″N 23°20′10″E
- Country: Poland
- Voivodeship: Podlaskie
- County: Białystok
- Gmina: Supraśl

Sadowy Stok [saˈdɔvɨ ˈstɔk] is a settlement in the administrative district of Gmina Supraśl, within Białystok County, Podlaskie Voivodeship, in north-eastern Poland.
