= Pieczonka, Podlaskie Voivodeship =

Pieczonka
- Settlement
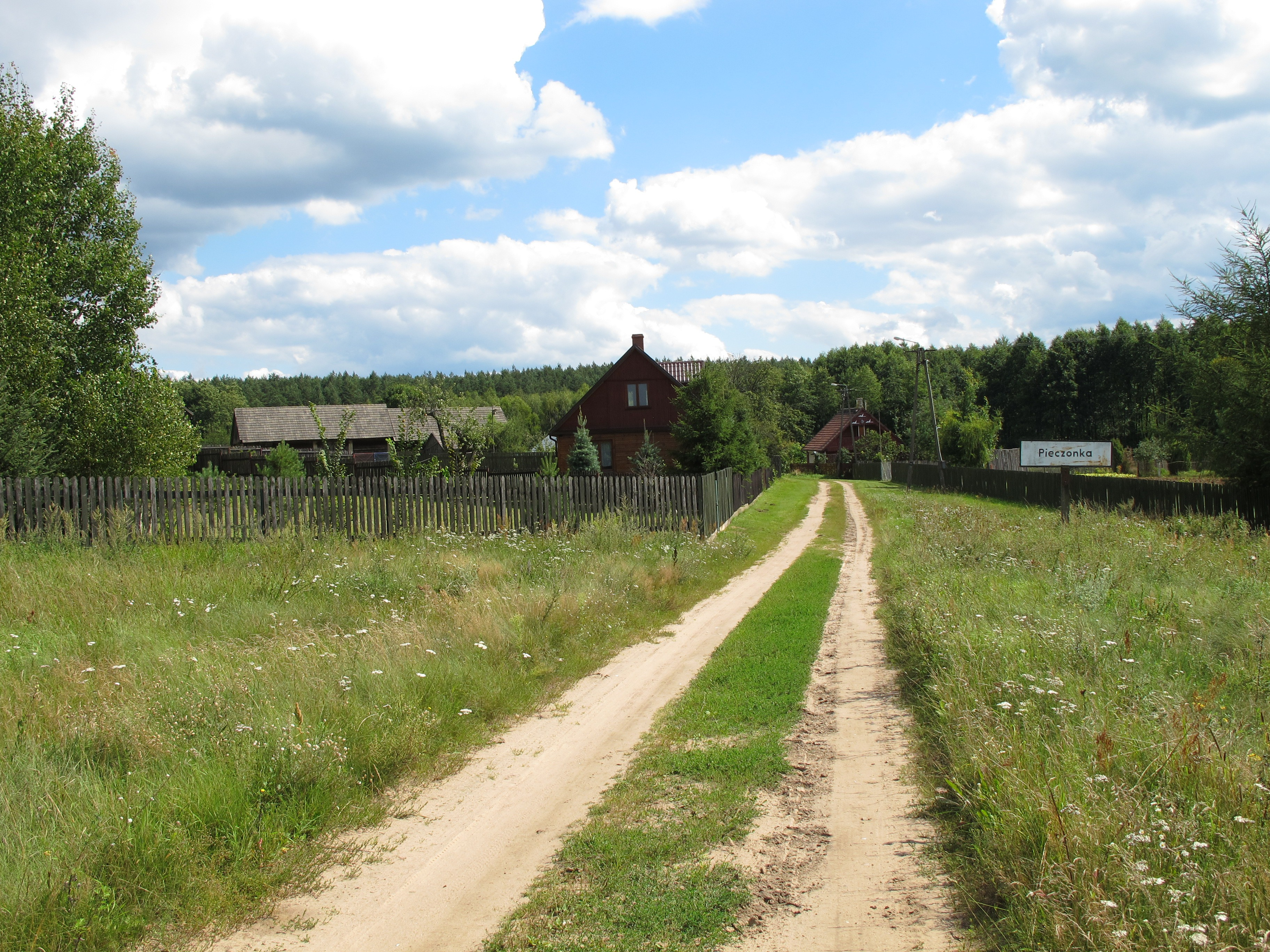

- Location within Poland
- Coordinates: 53°13′31″N 23°28′51″E
- Country: Poland
- Voivodeship: Podlaskie
- County: Białystok
- Gmina: Supraśl

Pieczonka [pjɛˈt͡ʂɔŋka] is a settlement in the administrative district of Gmina Supraśl, within Białystok County, Podlaskie Voivodeship, in north-eastern Poland.
