= Turo (village) =

- Settlement
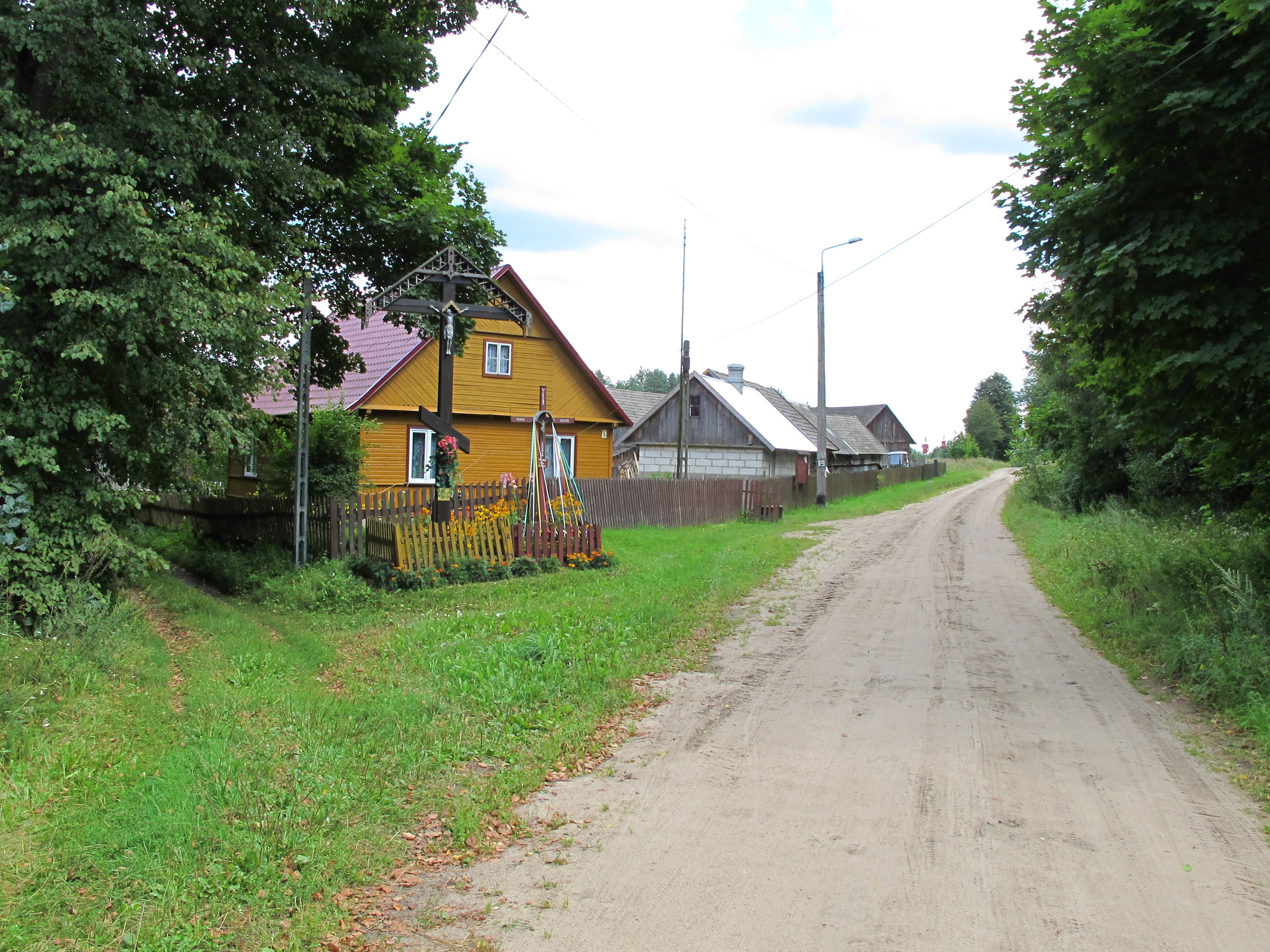

- Location within Poland
- Coordinates: 53°13′1″N 23°26′35″E
- Country: Poland
- Voivodeship: Podlaskie
- County: Białystok
- Gmina: Supraśl
- Time zone: UTC+1 (CET)
  - Summer (DST): UTC+2 (CEST)
- Postal code: 16-030
- ISO 3166 code: POL
- Vehicle registration: BIA

Turo [ˈturɔ] is a settlement in the administrative district of Gmina Supraśl, within Białystok County, Podlaskie Voivodeship, in north-eastern Poland.
