= Izoby =

- Village
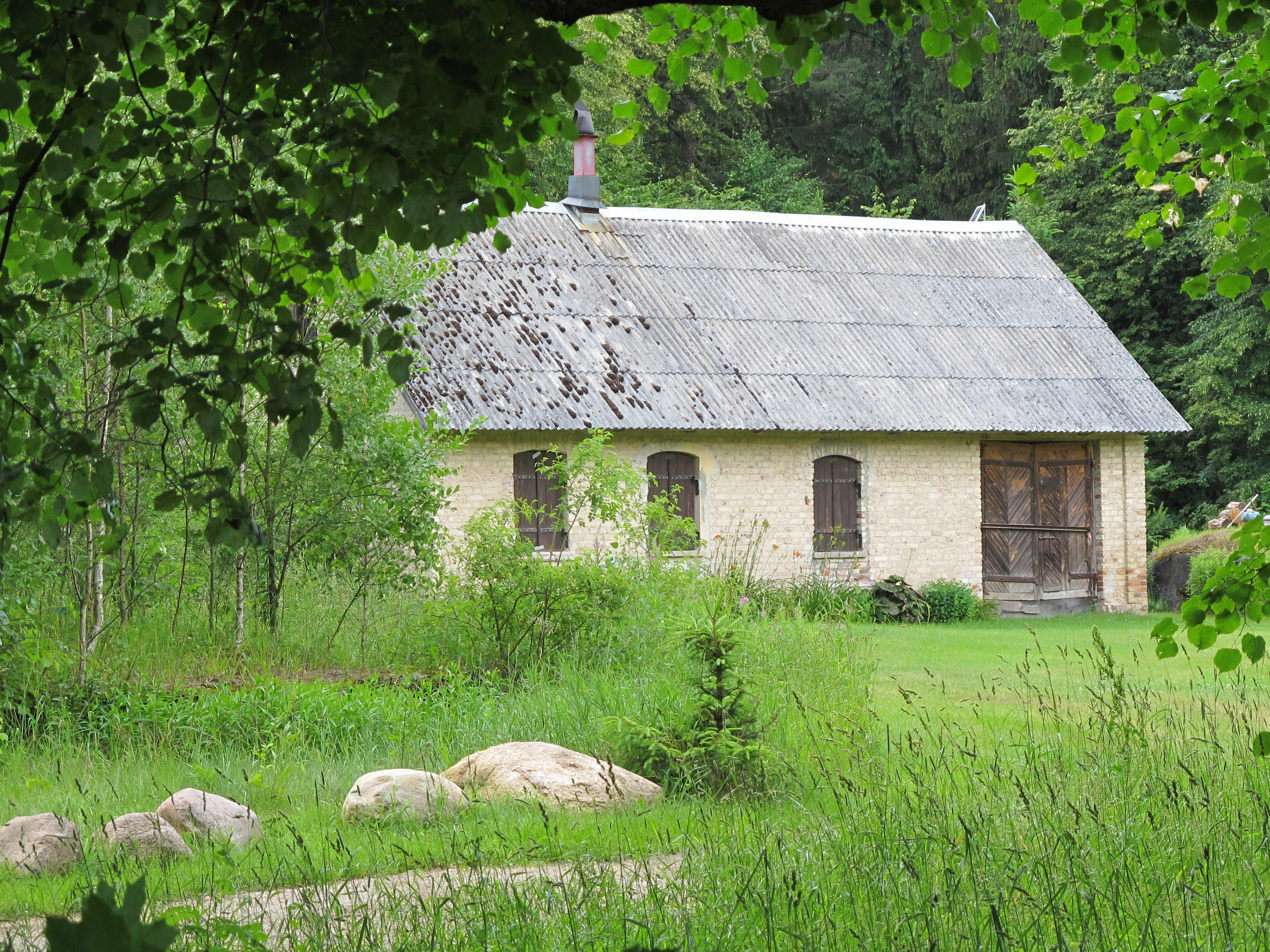

- Location within Poland
- Coordinates: 53°8′28″N 23°21′3″E
- Country: Poland
- Voivodeship: Podlaskie
- County: Białystok
- Gmina: Grabówka

Izoby [iˈzɔbɨ] is a village in the administrative district of Gmina Grabówka, within Białystok County, Podlaskie Voivodeship, in north-eastern Poland.
