= Kozly (Louny District) =

- Municipality
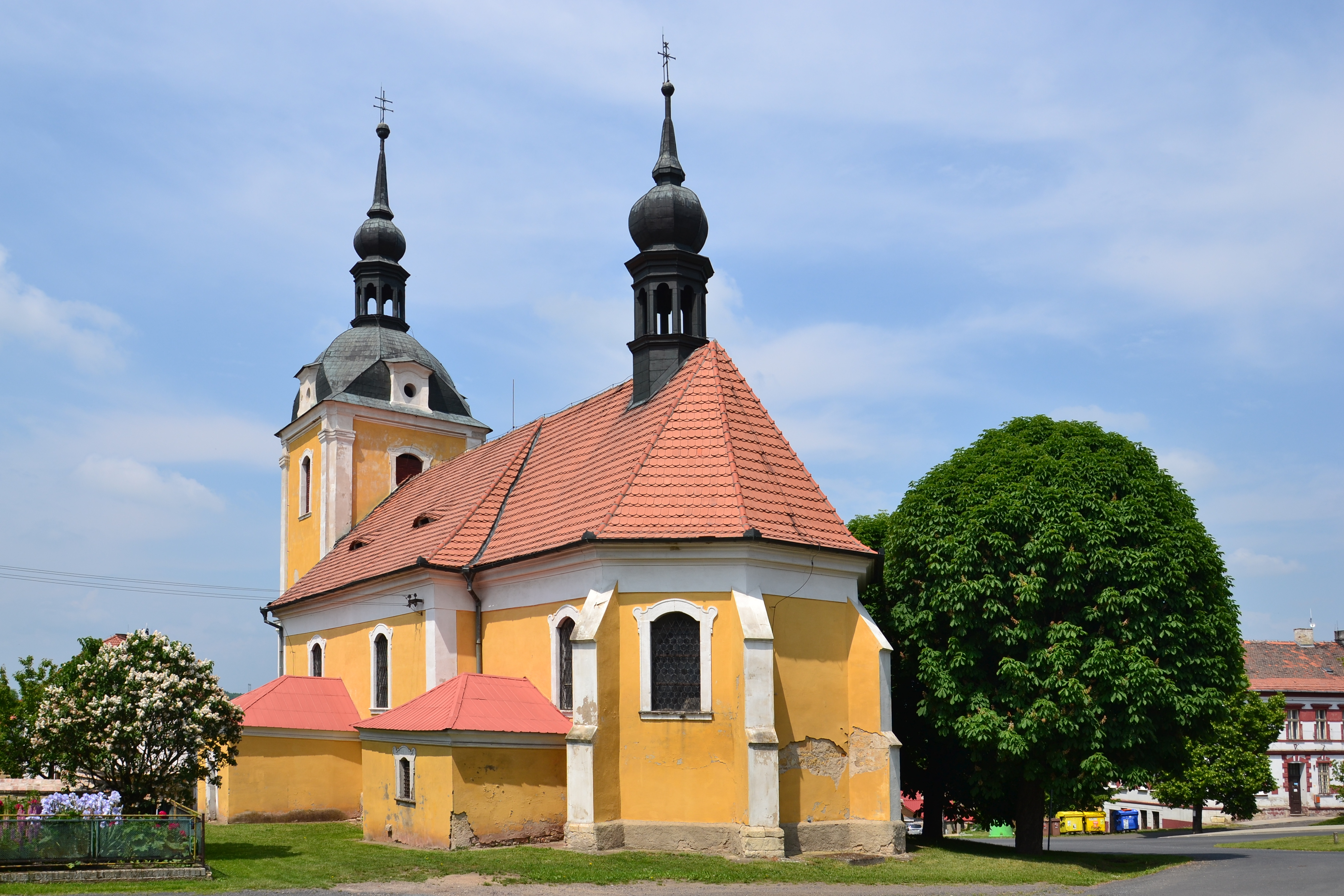
- Church of Saint Martin

- Location in the Czech Republic
- Coordinates: 50°27′25″N 13°47′5″E
- Country: Czech Republic
- Region: Ústí nad Labem
- District: Louny
- First mentioned: 1352

Area
  - Total: 4.36 km^{2} (1.68 sq mi)
- Elevation: 356 m (1,168 ft)

Population (2026-01-01)
  - Total: 125
  - Density: 28.7/km^{2} (74.3/sq mi)
- Time zone: UTC+1 (CET)
  - Summer (DST): UTC+2 (CEST)
- Postal code: 440 01
- Website: www.obeckozly.cz

Kozly is a municipality and village in Louny District in the Ústí nad Labem Region of the Czech Republic. It has about 100 inhabitants.

Kozly lies approximately 12 kilometres (7 mi) north of Louny, 29 km (18 mi) south-west of Ústí nad Labem, and 62 km (39 mi) north-west of Prague.

== Demographics ==
Historical population
| Year | Pop. | ±% |
|---|---|---|
| 1869 | 265 | — |
| 1880 | 262 | −1.1% |
| 1890 | 223 | −14.9% |
| 1900 | 231 | +3.6% |
| 1910 | 234 | +1.3% |
| 1921 | 223 | −4.7% |
| 1930 | 238 | +6.7% |
| 1950 | 154 | −35.3% |
| 1961 | 185 | +20.1% |
| 1970 | 175 | −5.4% |
| 1980 | 148 | −15.4% |
| 1991 | 98 | −33.8% |
| 2001 | 99 | +1.0% |
| 2011 | 145 | +46.5% |
| 2021 | 125 | −13.8% |
Source: Censuses
