= Turo-Gajówka =

- Village
- Location within Poland
- Coordinates: 53°13′51″N 23°26′05″E
- Country: Poland
- Voivodeship: Podlaskie
- County: Białystok
- Gmina: Supraśl

Turo-Gajówka [ˈturɔ ɡaˈjufka] is a village in the administrative district of Gmina Supraśl, within Białystok County, Podlaskie Voivodeship, in north-eastern Poland.
