= Białystok metropolitan area =

Coordinates: 53°07′00″N 23°09′00″E

- Urban area
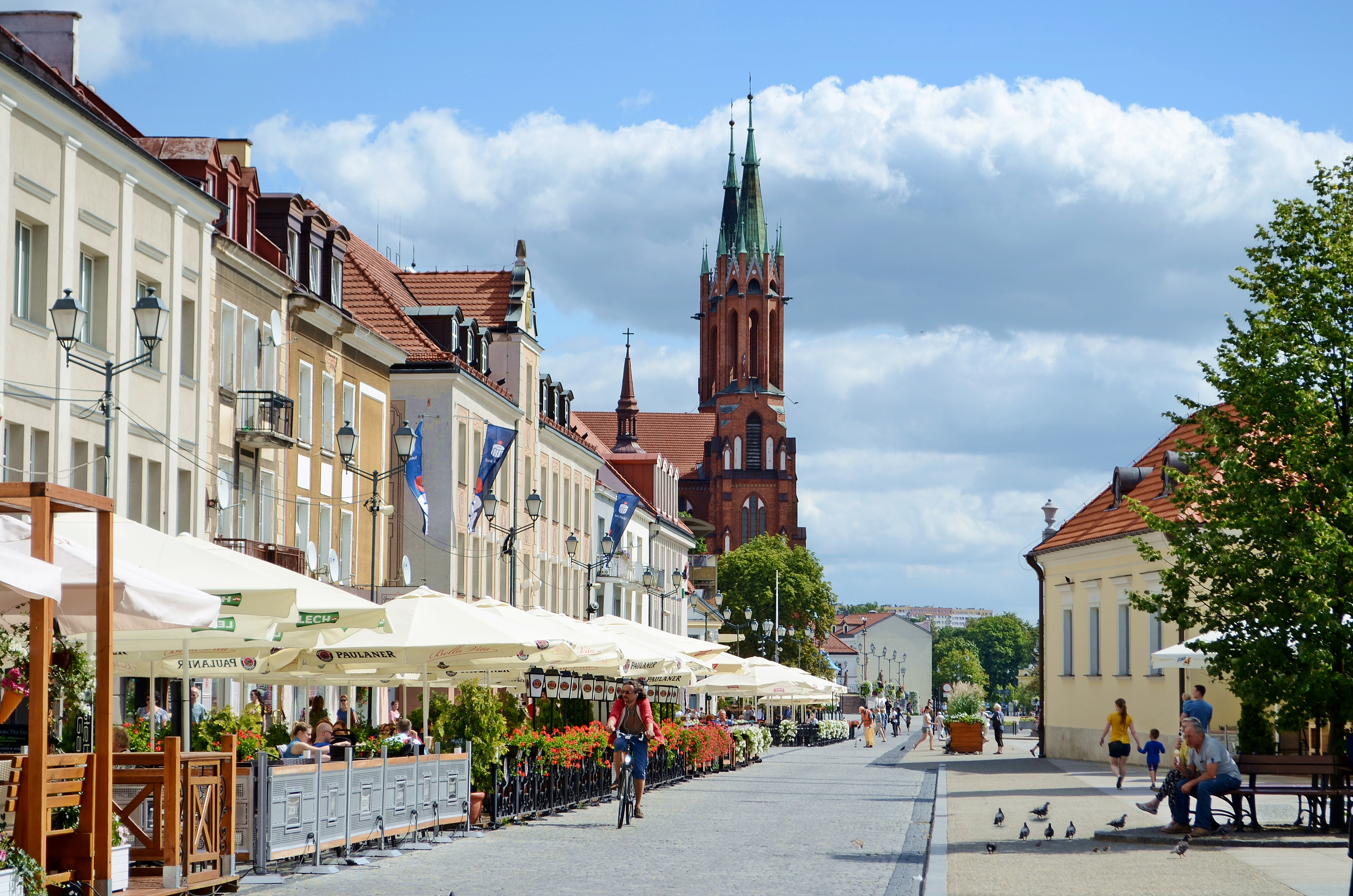
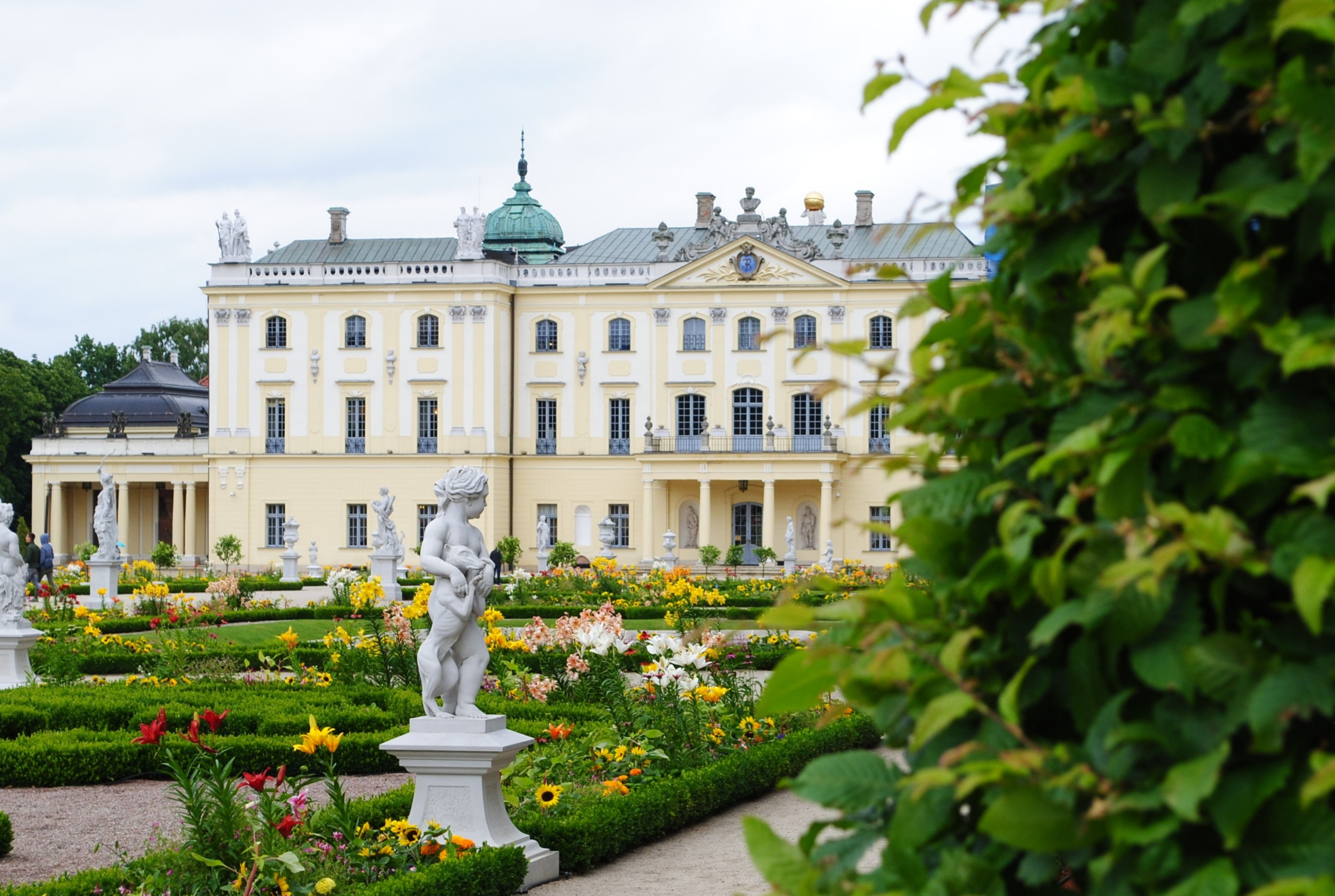
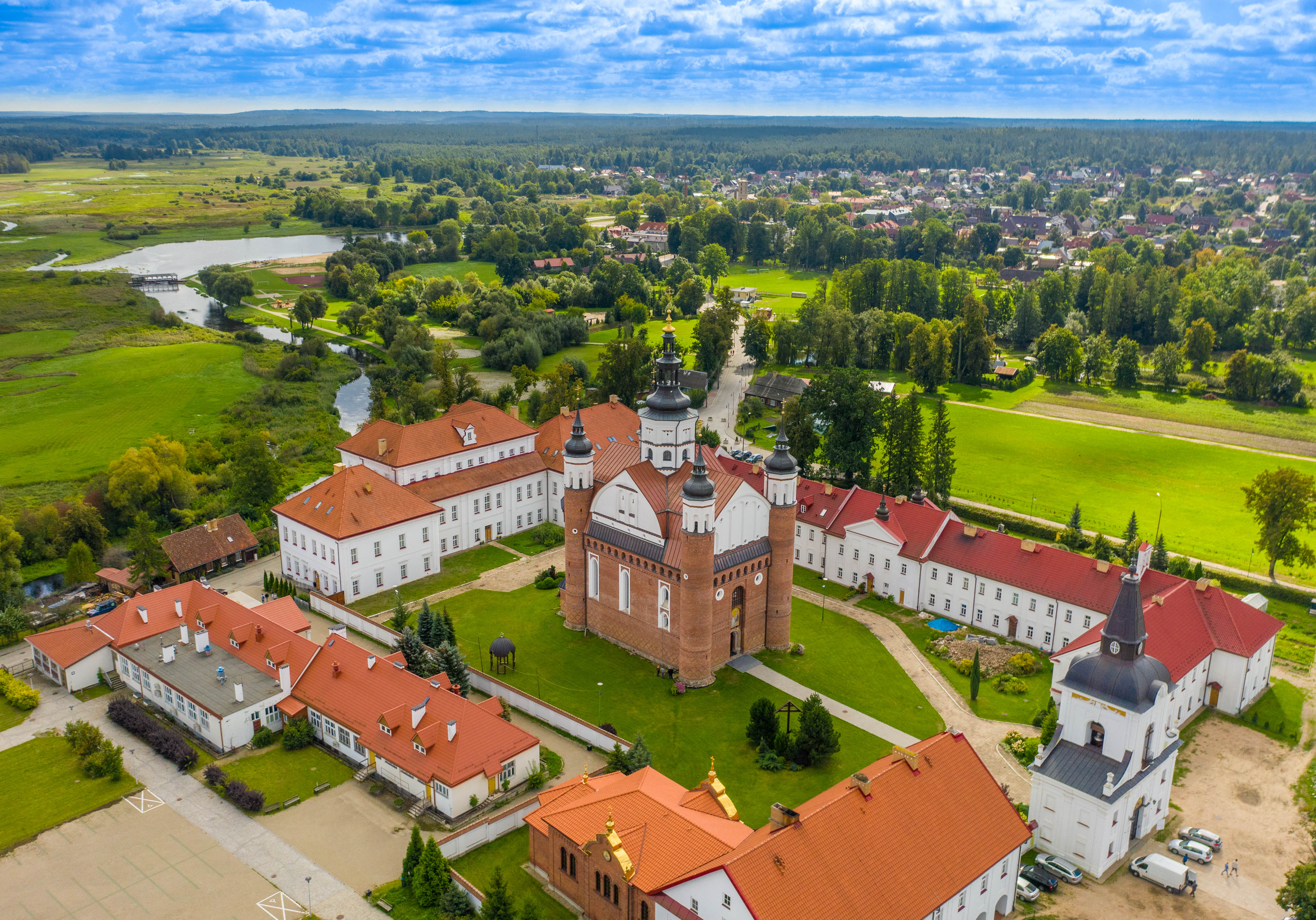
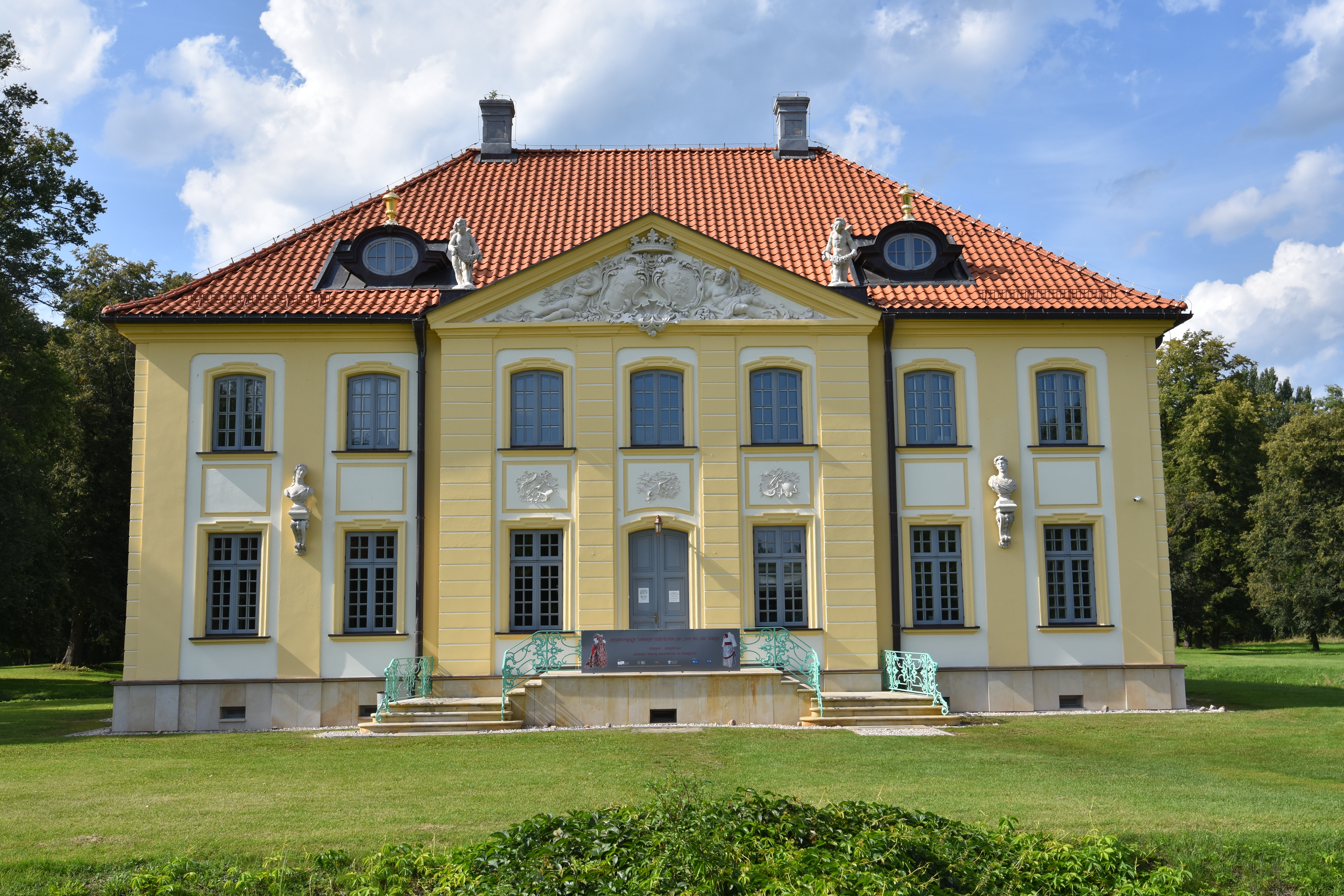
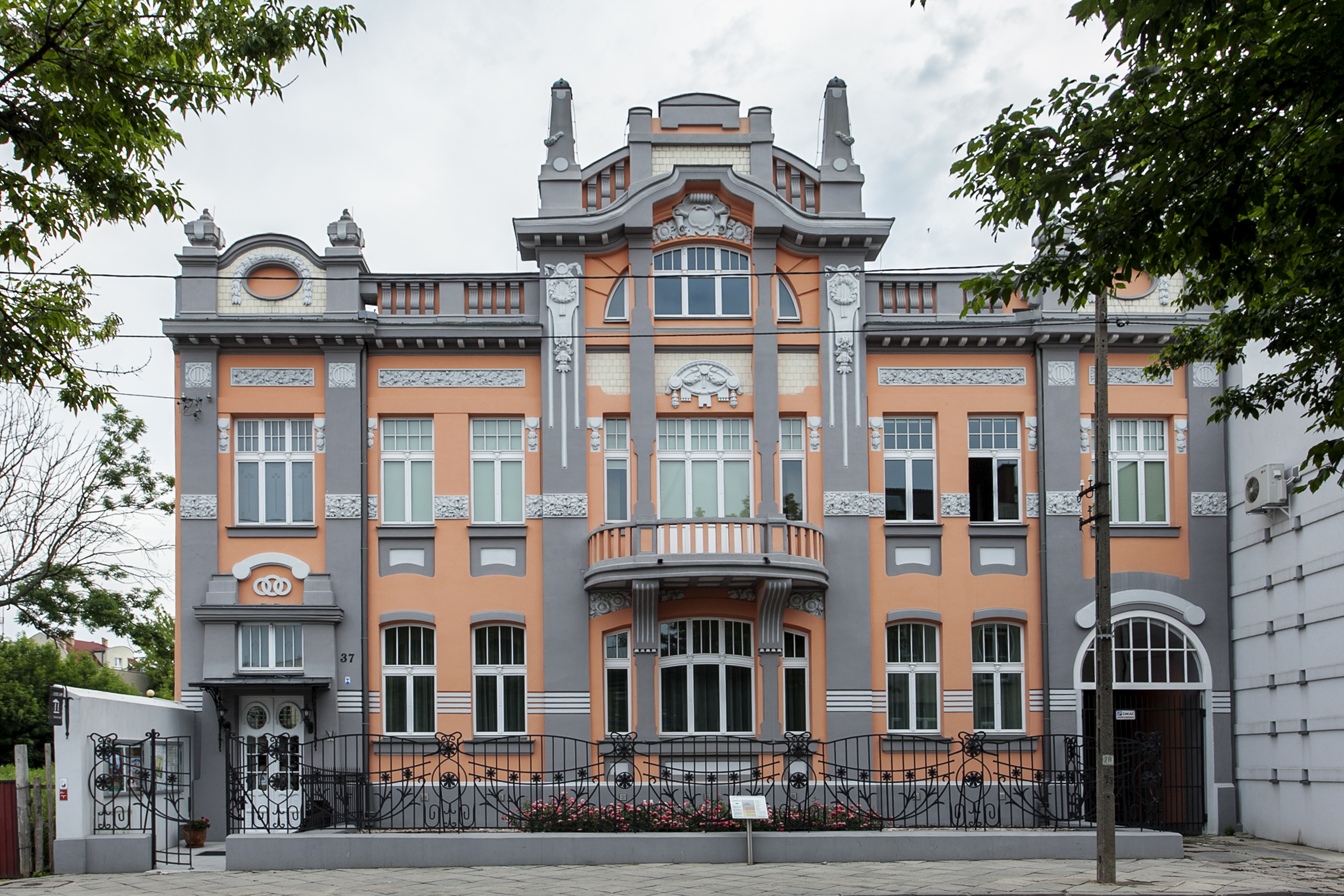
- From top, left to right: Historic city center of Białystok; Branicki Palace in Białystok; Monastery of the Annunciation in Supraśl; Branicki Palace in Choroszcz; Historical Museum in Białystok
- Interactive map of Białystok metropolitan area
- Country: Poland
- Voivodship: Podlaskie

Area
  - Metro: 1,805 km^{2} (697 sq mi)

Population (2013)
  - Metro: 414,751

GDP
  - Metro: €6.452 billion (2021)
- Time zone: UTC+1 (CET)
  - Summer (DST): UTC+2 (CEST)

Metropolitan Białystok is a metropolitan area designated by the Governor of the Regulation No. 52/05 of 16 May 2005 in order to help economically develop the region.

In 2006, the metropolitan area population was 450,254 inhabitants. Covering the area of 1.521 km ², it had population density of about 265 people per one km^{2}. Among urban residents were more women - 192 thousand. on 100 men, 108 women on average.

The metropolitan area includes:

- the city of Białystok,
- the villages in Gmina Choroszcz:
  - Jeroniki, Klepacze, Krupniki, Łyski, Porosły, Sienkiewicze and Turczyn,
- the villages in Gmina Dobrzyniewo Duże:
  - Bohdan, Borsukówka, Chraboły, Dobrzyniewo Duże, Dobrzyniewo Fabryczne*, Dobrzyniewo Kościelne*, Fasty*, Gniła, Jaworówka, Kozińce, Kulikówka, Krynice, Letniki, Leńce, Nowe Aleksandrowo*, Obrubniki, Ogrodniki*, Pogorzałki, Ponikła, Podleńce, Szaciły and Zalesie
- the villages in Gmina Juchnowiec Kościelny:
  - Bronczany, Izabelin, Kleosin, Księżyno, Kolonia Księżyno, Koplany, Kolonia Koplany, Lewickie, Niewodnica Nargilewska, Solniczki and Stanisławowo
- the town of Supraśl and the villages in Gmina Supraśl:
  - Grabówka, Henrykowo, Karakule and Ogrodniczki
- the town of Wasilków and the villages in Gmina Wasilków:
  - Dąbrówki, Katrynka, Jurowce*, Osowicze*, Sochonie*, Studzianki, Nowodworce*, Sielachowskie*, Wólka Poduchowna, Wólka-Przedmieście and Woroszyły,
- the villages in Gmina Zabłudów:
  - Halickie, Kuriany and Skrybicze

* village added via Regulation No. 2 / 2008 of 28 January 2008 amending the Decree of 29 September 2006 on the designation of Metropolitan Białystok.

== See also ==
- Metropolitan areas in Poland
