= Nowosiółki, Gmina Dobrzyniewo Duże =

Nowosiółki
- Village
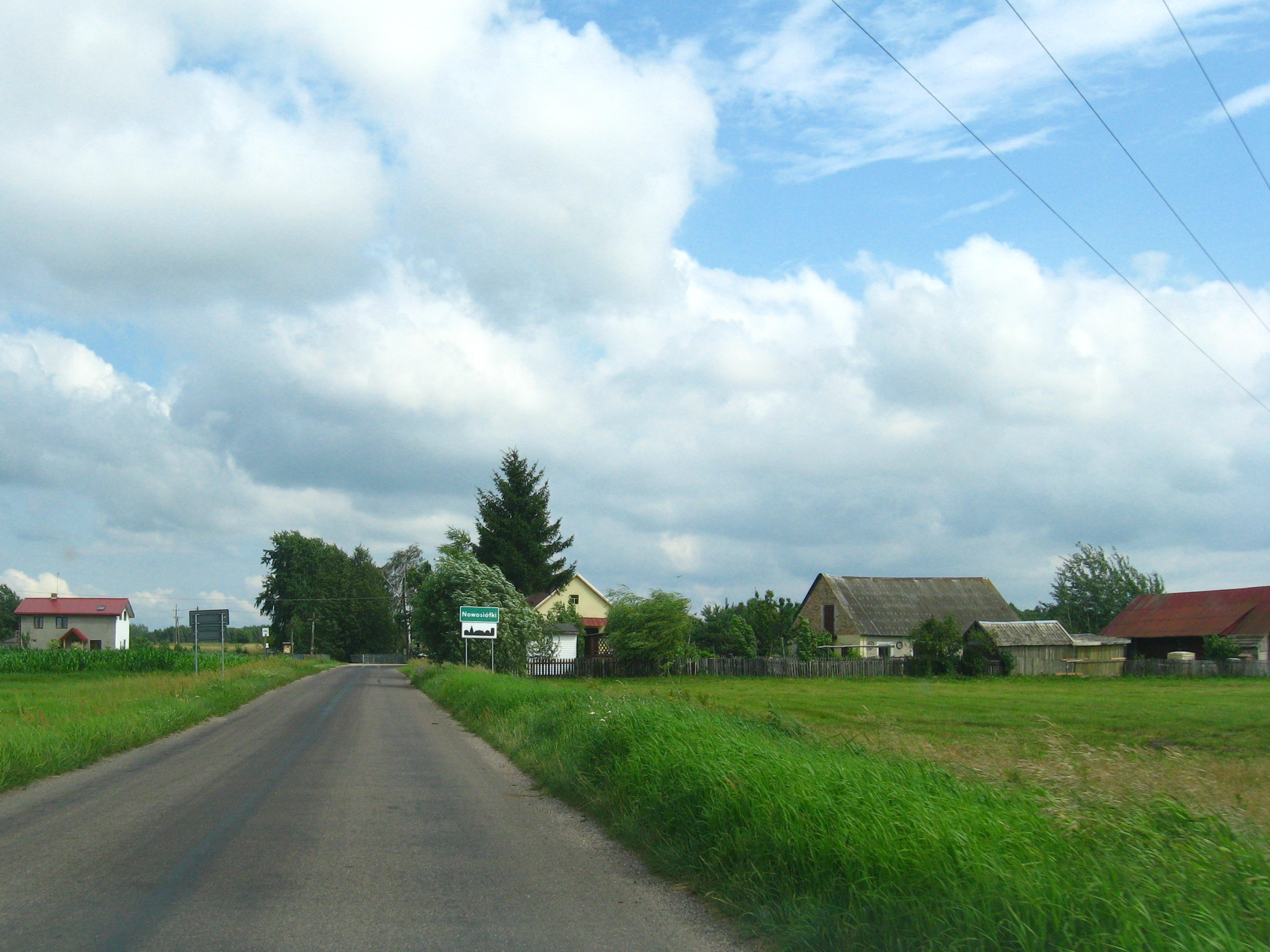
- Road in Nowosiolki

- Location within Poland
- Coordinates: 53°15′24″N 22°55′20″E
- Country: Poland
- Voivodeship: Podlaskie
- County: Białystok
- Gmina: Dobrzyniewo Duże

Nowosiółki [nɔvɔˈɕuu̯ki] is a village in the administrative district of Gmina Dobrzyniewo Duże, within Białystok County, Podlaskie Voivodeship, in north-eastern Poland.
