= Krupniki =

- Village
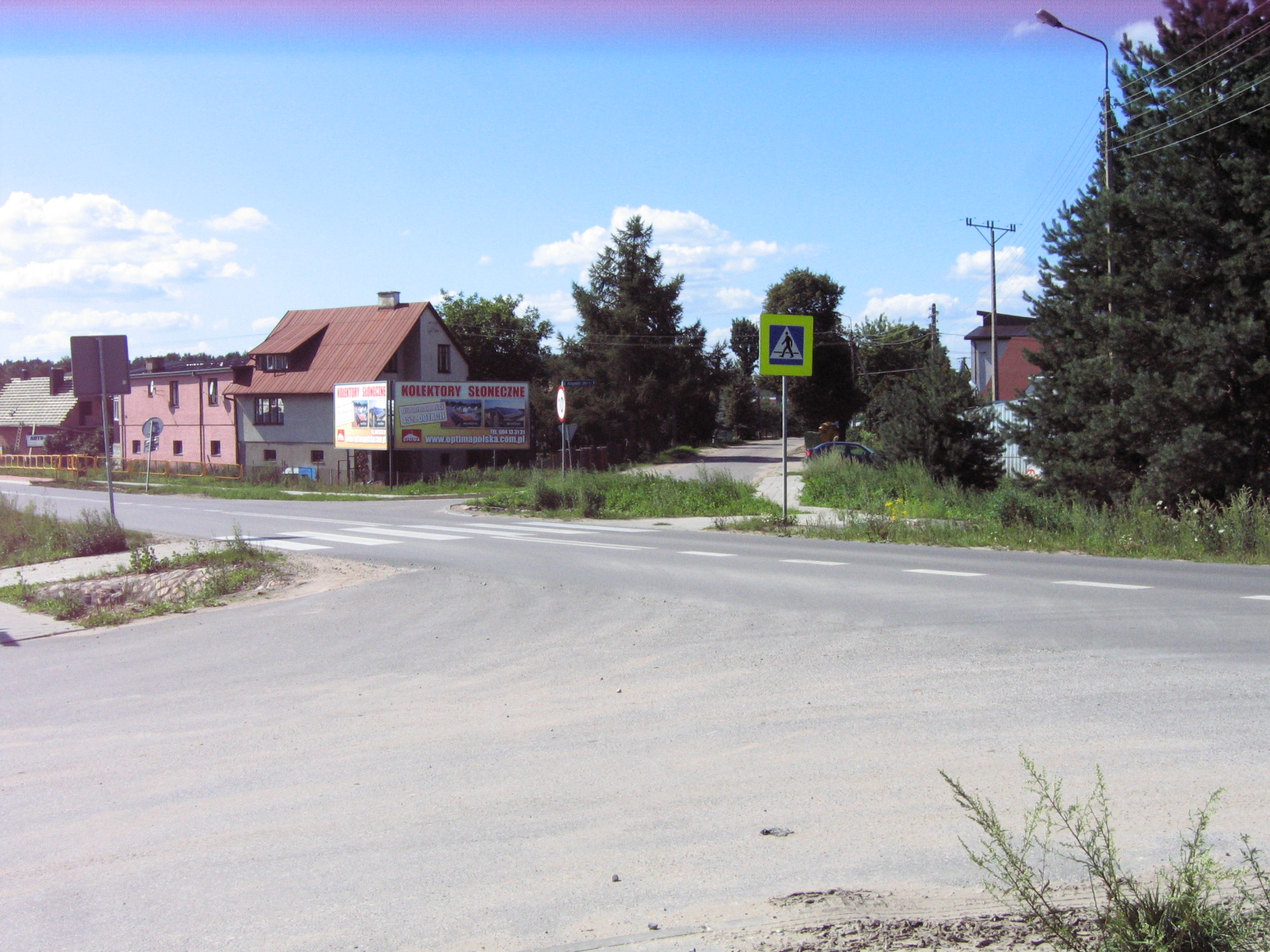

- Location within Poland
- Coordinates: 53°9′N 23°4′E
- Country: Poland
- Voivodeship: Podlaskie
- County: Białystok
- Gmina: Choroszcz
- Population: 364

Krupniki [krupˈniki] is a village in the administrative district of Gmina Choroszcz, within Białystok County, Podlaskie Voivodeship, in north-eastern Poland.

The village is considered part of Metropolitan Białystok in order to help economically develop the region.
