= Klepacze, Białystok County =

Klepacze
- Village
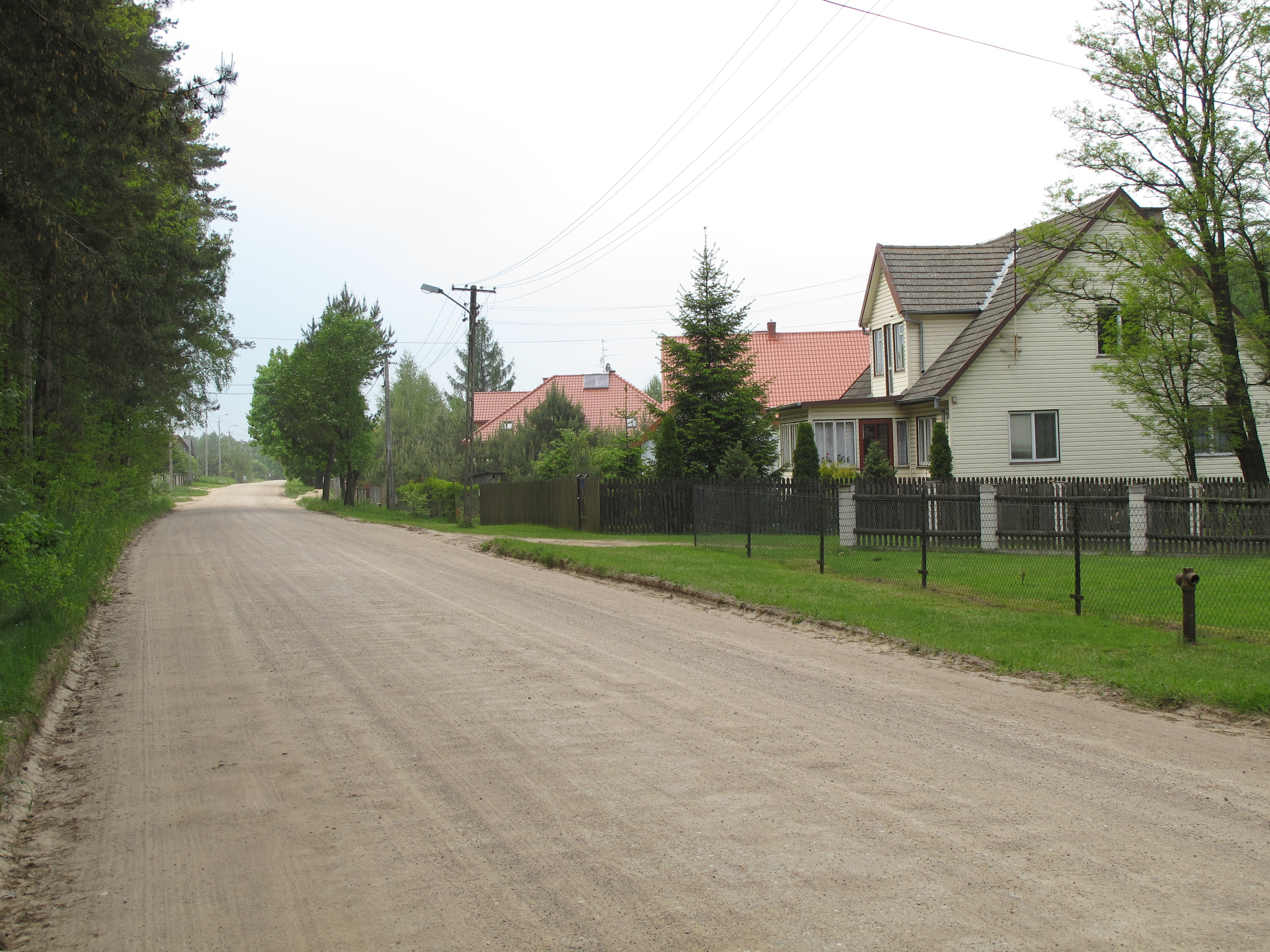

- Location within Poland
- Coordinates: 53°6′N 23°4′E
- Country: Poland
- Voivodeship: Podlaskie
- County: Białystok
- Gmina: Choroszcz
- Population: 945

Klepacze [klɛˈpat͡ʂɛ] is a village in the administrative district of Gmina Choroszcz, within Białystok County, Podlaskie Voivodeship, in north-eastern Poland.

The village is considered part of Metropolitan Białystok in order to help economically develop the region.
