= Rybaki, Gmina Dobrzyniewo Duże =

Rybaki
- Village
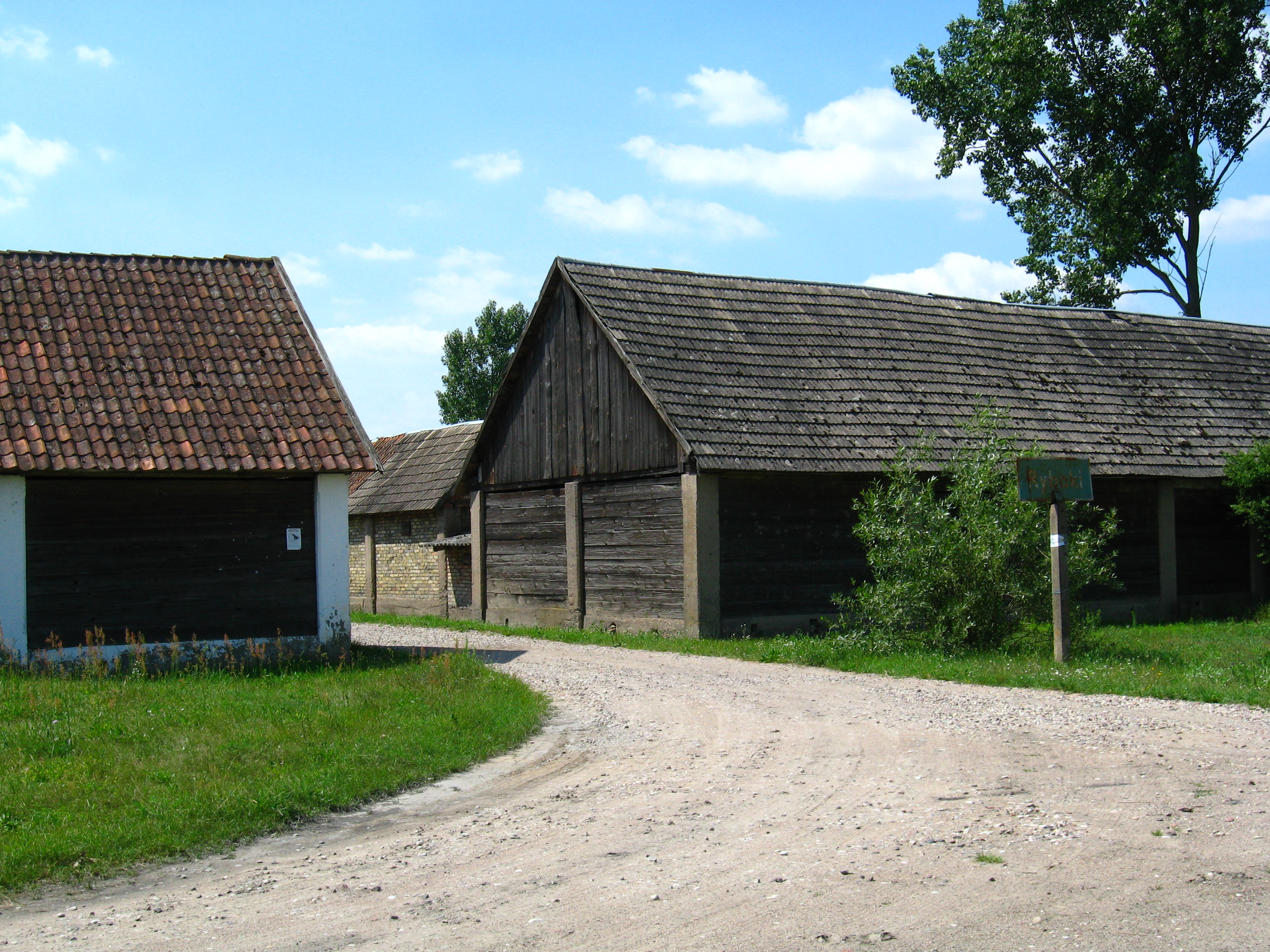

- Location within Poland
- Coordinates: 53°11′57″N 22°56′38″E
- Country: Poland
- Voivodeship: Podlaskie
- County: Białystok
- Gmina: Dobrzyniewo Duże

Rybaki [rɨˈbaki] is a village in the administrative district of Gmina Dobrzyniewo Duże, within Białystok County, Podlaskie Voivodeship, in north-eastern Poland.
