= Kobuzie =

- Village
- Location within Poland
- Coordinates: 53°14′46″N 22°55′0″E
- Country: Poland
- Voivodeship: Podlaskie
- County: Białystok
- Gmina: Dobrzyniewo Duże
- Population: 40

Kobuzie [kɔˈbuʑɛ] is a village in the administrative district of Gmina Dobrzyniewo Duże, within Białystok County, Podlaskie Voivodeship, in north-eastern Poland.
