= Chraboły, Białystok County =

Chraboły
- Village
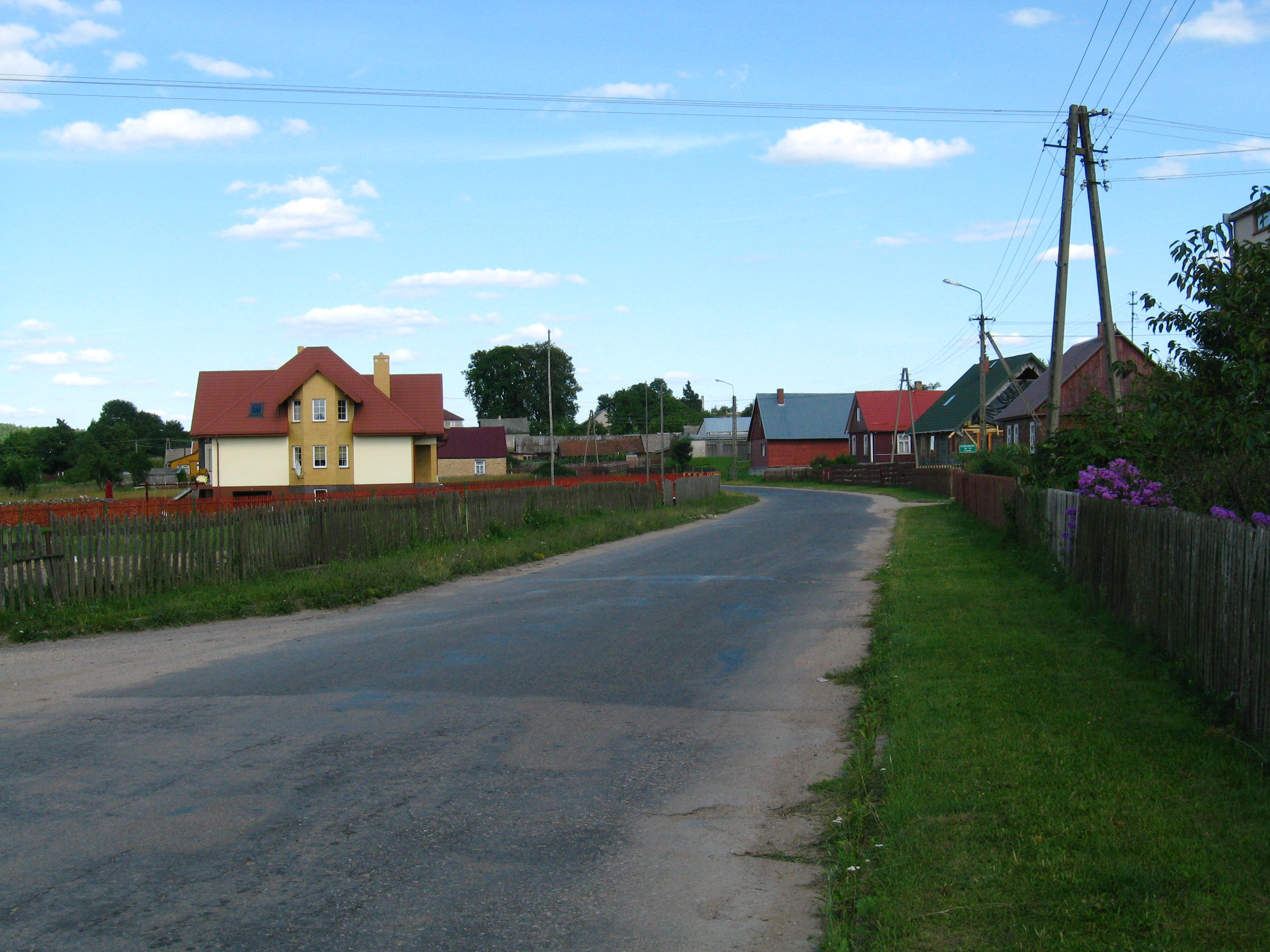
- Houses in Chraboły, August 2009

- Location within Poland
- Coordinates: 53°16′29″N 22°59′22″E
- Country: Poland
- Voivodeship: Podlaskie
- County: Białystok
- Gmina: Bielsk Podlaski

Chraboły [xraˈbɔwɨ] is a village in the administrative district of Gmina Dobrzyniewo Duże, within Białystok County, Podlaskie Voivodeship, in north-eastern Poland.
