= Szaciły, Białystok County =

Szaciły
- Village
- Location within Poland
- Coordinates: 53°14′56″N 23°1′46″E
- Country: Poland
- Voivodeship: Podlaskie
- County: Białystok
- Gmina: Dobrzyniewo Duże

Szaciły [ʂaˈt͡ɕiwɨ] is a village in the administrative district of Gmina Dobrzyniewo Duże, within Białystok County, Podlaskie Voivodeship, in north-eastern Poland.
