= Choroszcz =

Town in Podlaskie Voivodeship, Poland

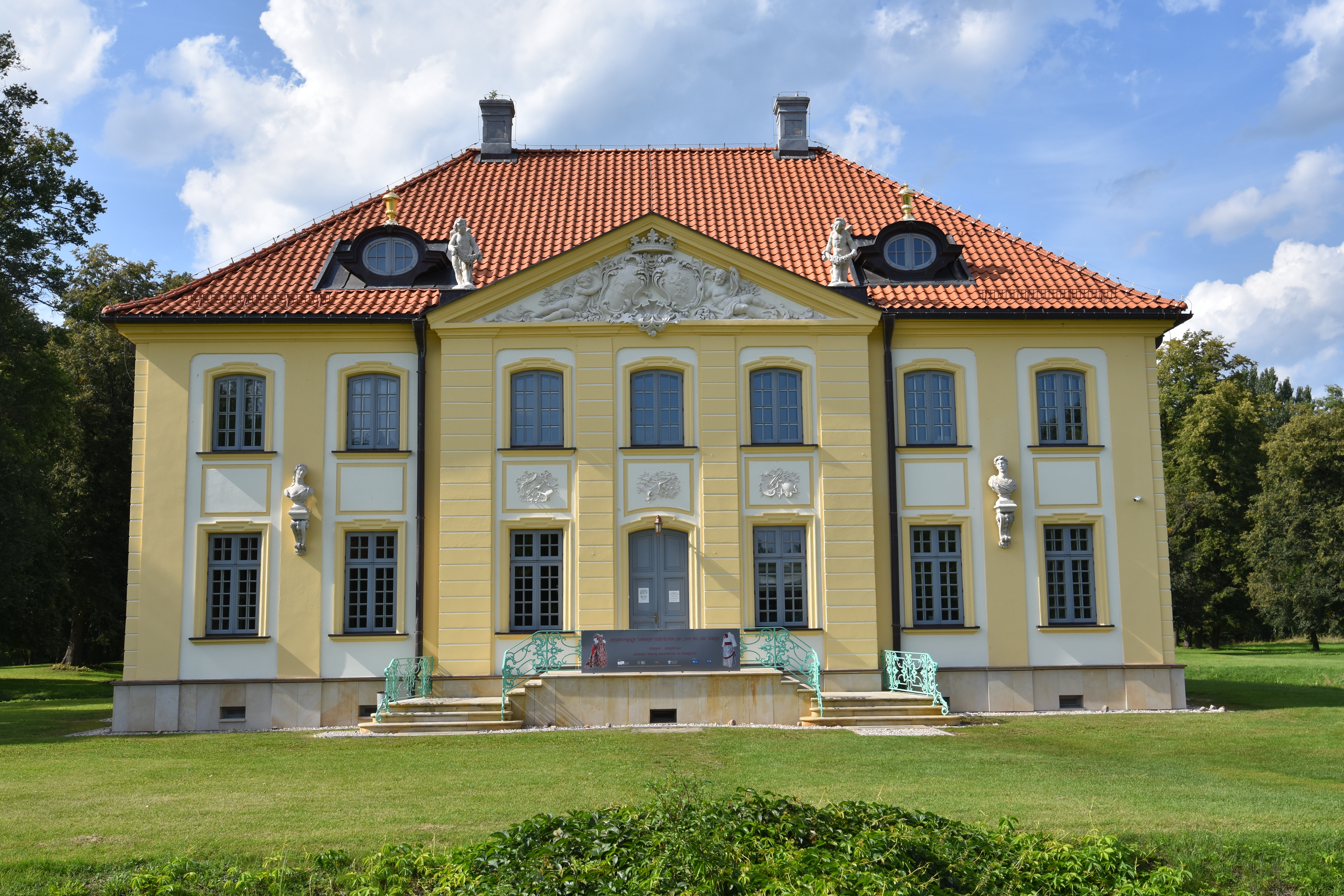
- Branicki Palace

- Flag Coat of arms

- Location within Poland
- Coordinates: 53°8′N 22°59′E
- Country: Poland
- Voivodeship: Podlaskie
- County: Białystok
- Gmina: Choroszcz
- Town rights: 1507

Government
  - Mayor: Robert Wardziński

Area
  - Total: 16.79 km^{2} (6.48 sq mi)
- Elevation: 130–175 m (427–574 ft)

Population (31 December 2021)
  - Total: 5,960
  - Density: 355/km^{2} (919/sq mi)
- Time zone: UTC+1 (CET)
  - Summer (DST): UTC+2 (CEST)
- Postal code: 16-070
- Area code: +48 85
- Car plates: BIA
- Website: http://choroszcz.pl/

Choroszcz ([ˈxɔrɔʂt͡ʂ]) is a town in north-eastern Poland, located in the Białystok metropolitan area, Białystok County, Podlaskie Voivodeship, seat of Gmina Choroszcz.

The Baroque palace in Choroszcz was the summer residence of the noble Branicki family, and is now part of the Museum of Polish Interiors. As of December 2021, the town has a population of 5,960.

== History ==
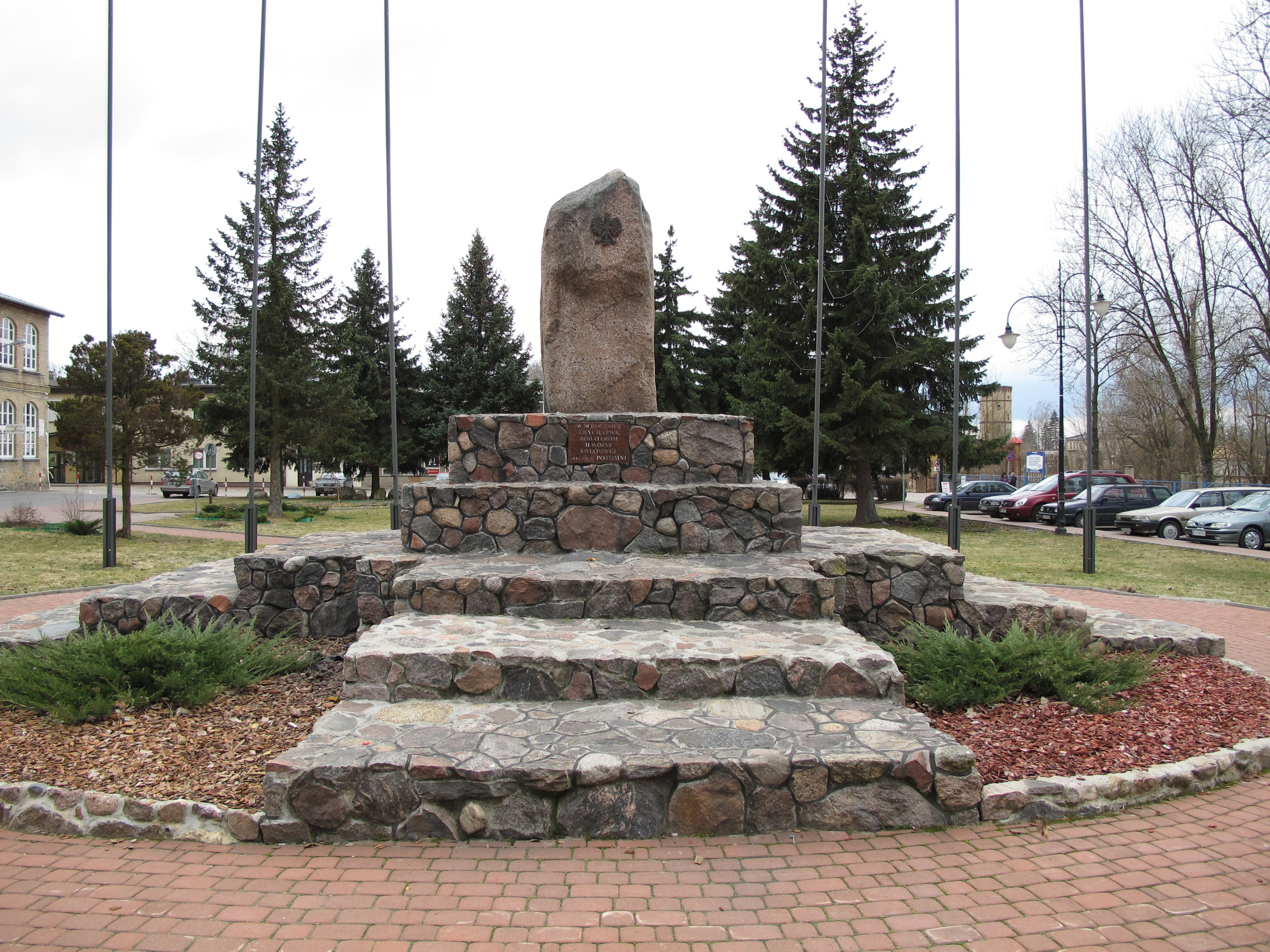
World War II Heroes Monument

Choroszcz was granted town rights by King Sigismund I the Old in 1507. It was a private town, administratively located in the Podlaskie Voivodeship in the Lesser Poland Province. Jan Klemens Branicki erected a Baroque palace, which served as the summer residence of the Branicki family. Following the Third Partition of Poland, in 1795, it was annexed by Prussia. In 1807, it passed to the Russian Partition of Poland. Choroszcz was one of the sites of Russian executions of Polish insurgents during the January Uprising. The execution sites are now marked by memorials. Following World War I, Poland regained independence and control of the town.

In 1930, a psychiatric hospital was established in the town.

Following the joint German-Soviet invasion of Poland, which started World War II in September 1939, the town was first occupied by the Soviet Union until 1941, and then by Germany until 1944. In 1940, the Russians closed the psychiatric hospital and deported some patients to the Soviet Union, while others were relocated to the local rectory. Several Poles who were either born or lived and worked in Choroszcz were murdered by the Russians in the Katyn massacre in 1940. In 1941, the Germans massacred several hundred remaining patients of the psychiatric hospital in today's Nowosiółki district as part of Aktion T4. In 1944, the German occupation ended and the town was restored to Poland, although with a Soviet-installed communist regime, which stayed in power until the Fall of Communism in the 1980s. The Polish anti-communist resistance was active in Choroszcz, and in 1945 it raided a local communist police station.

After the war, it was administratively located in the "large" Białystok Voivodeship until 1975, and then the "small" Białystok Voivodeship until 1998.

== Demographics ==
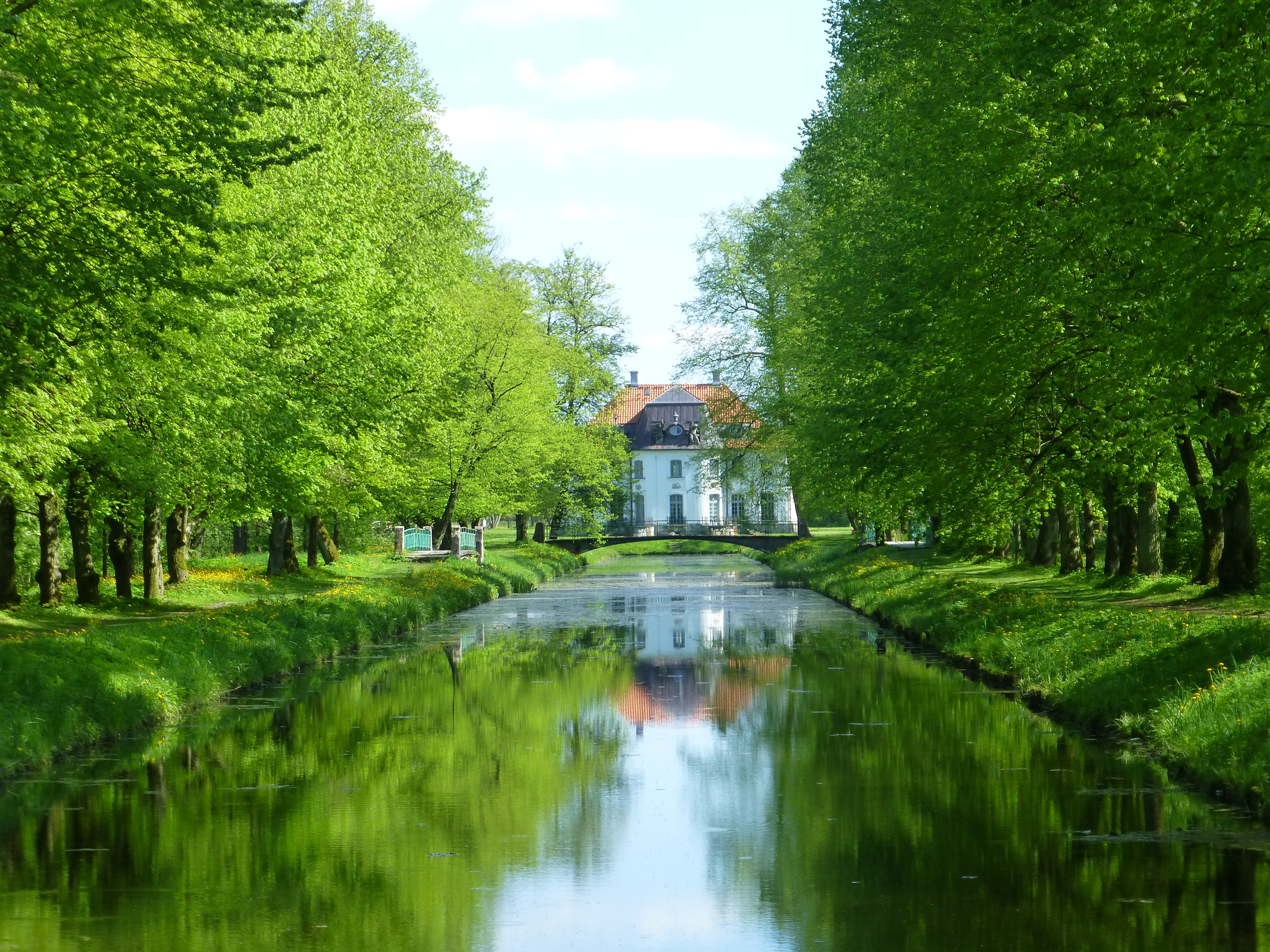
Branicki Palace park

Detailed data as of 31 December 2021:

Description	All		Women		Men	
Unit	person	percentage	person	percentage	person	percentage
Population	5960	100	2979	50.0%	2981	50.0%
Population density	355.0		177.5		177.5	

In the 1921 census, 81.2% people declared Polish nationality, 16.2% declared Jewish nationality and 1.8% declared German nationality. Choroszcz had 827 Jewish residents in 1897, and 450 in 1921. Nearly all were murdered in the Holocaust by the Germans during the Second World War.

=== Number of inhabitants by year ===
Historical population

Year	Pop.	±%
1897	2,464	—
1910	2,700	+9.6%
1921	2,405	−10.9%
1931	2,905	+20.8%
1939	3,028	+4.2%
1950	2,700	−10.8%
1960	3,607	+33.6%

Year	Pop.	±%
1995	5,132	+42.3%
2000	5,679	+10.7%
2005	5,424	−4.5%
2010	5,687	+4.8%
2015	5,789	+1.8%
2020	5,926	+2.4%

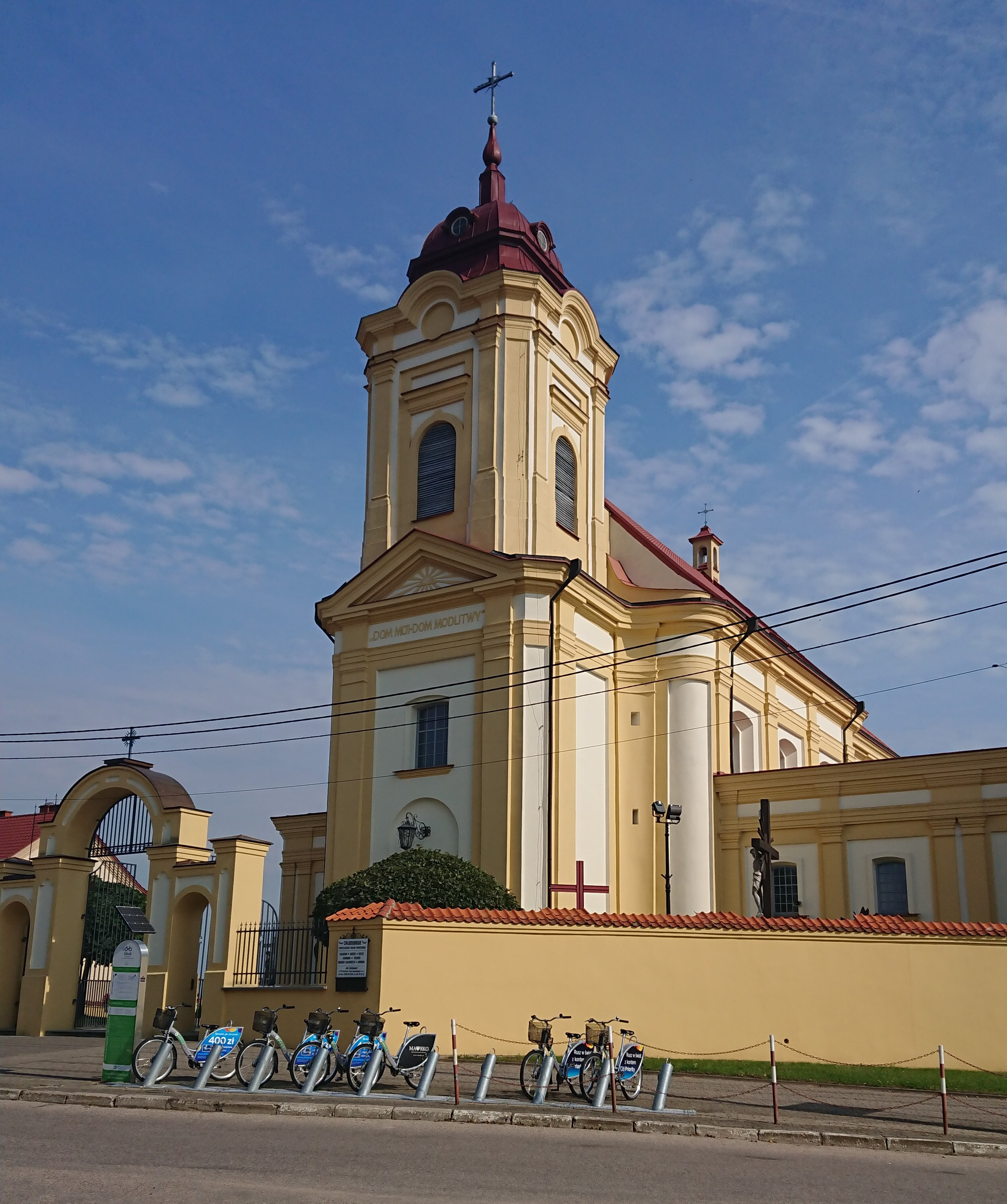
Baroque Church of Sts. John the Baptist and Stephen
