= Borsukówka =

- Village
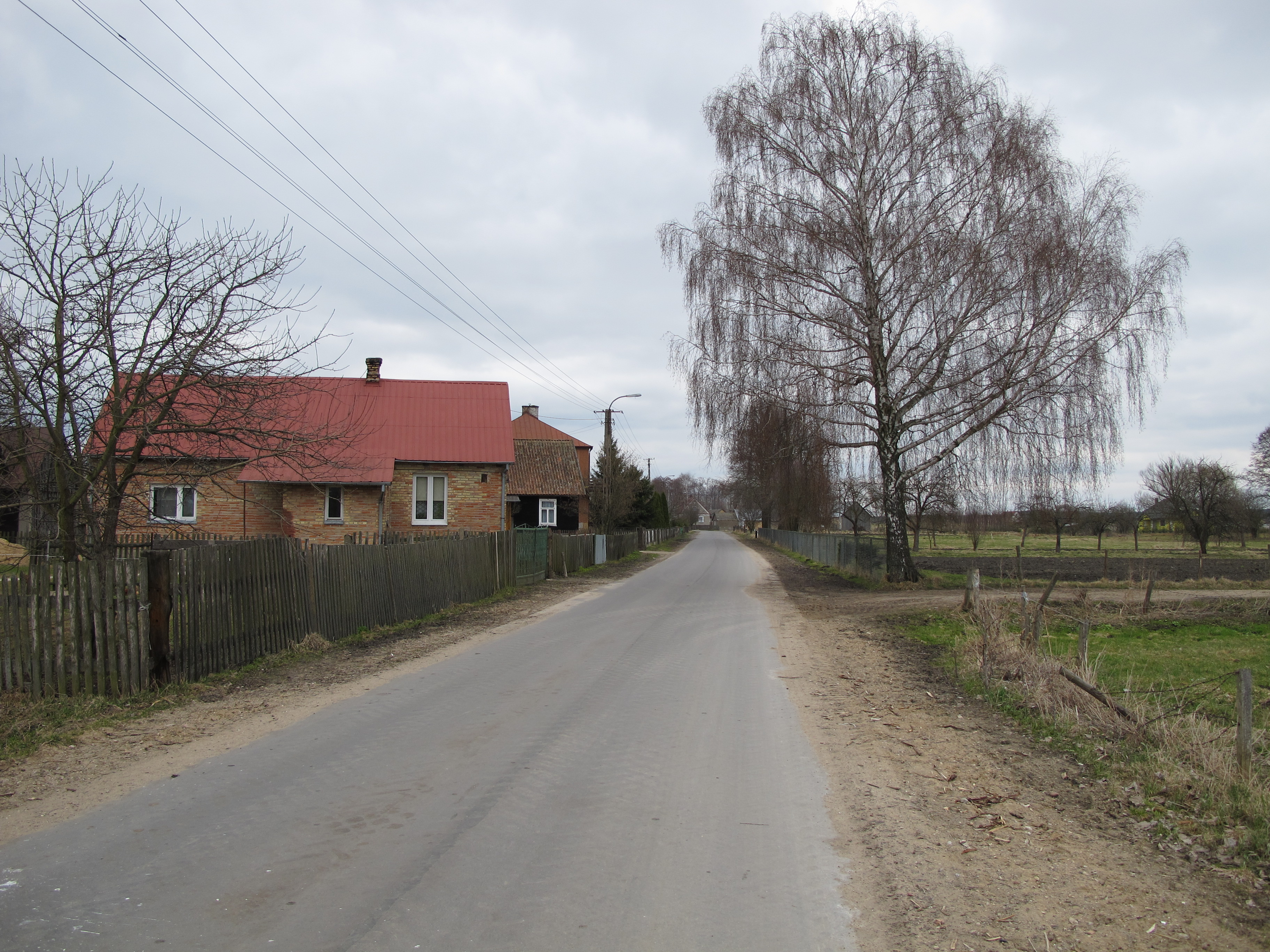
- View of Borsukówka in April 2010

- Location within Poland
- Coordinates: 53°15′28″N 23°0′15″E
- Country: Poland
- Voivodeship: Podlaskie
- County: Białystok
- Gmina: Dobrzyniewo Duże
- Population: 260

Borsukówka [bɔrsuˈkufka] is a village in the administrative district of Gmina Dobrzyniewo Duże, within Białystok County, Podlaskie Voivodeship, in north-eastern Poland.
