= Ogrodniki, Białystok County =

Ogrodniki
- Village
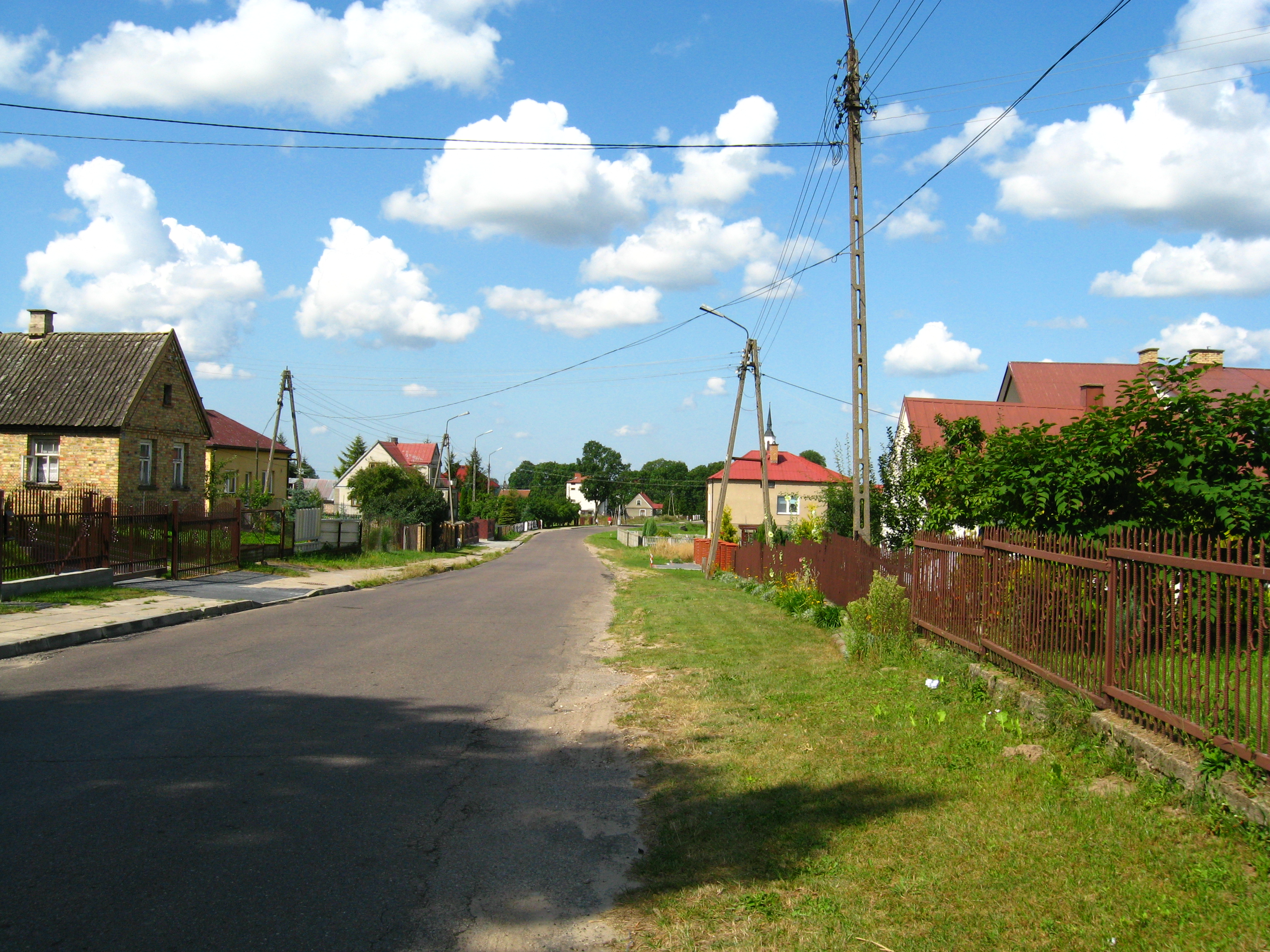
- Houses by the roadside of Ogrodniki

- Location within Poland
- Coordinates: 53°11′30″N 23°02′54″E
- Country: Poland
- Voivodeship: Podlaskie
- County: Białystok
- Gmina: Dobrzyniewo Duże

Ogrodniki [ɔɡrɔdˈniki] is a village in the administrative district of Gmina Dobrzyniewo Duże, within Białystok County, Podlaskie Voivodeship, in north-eastern Poland.
