= Dobrzyniewo Fabryczne =

- Village
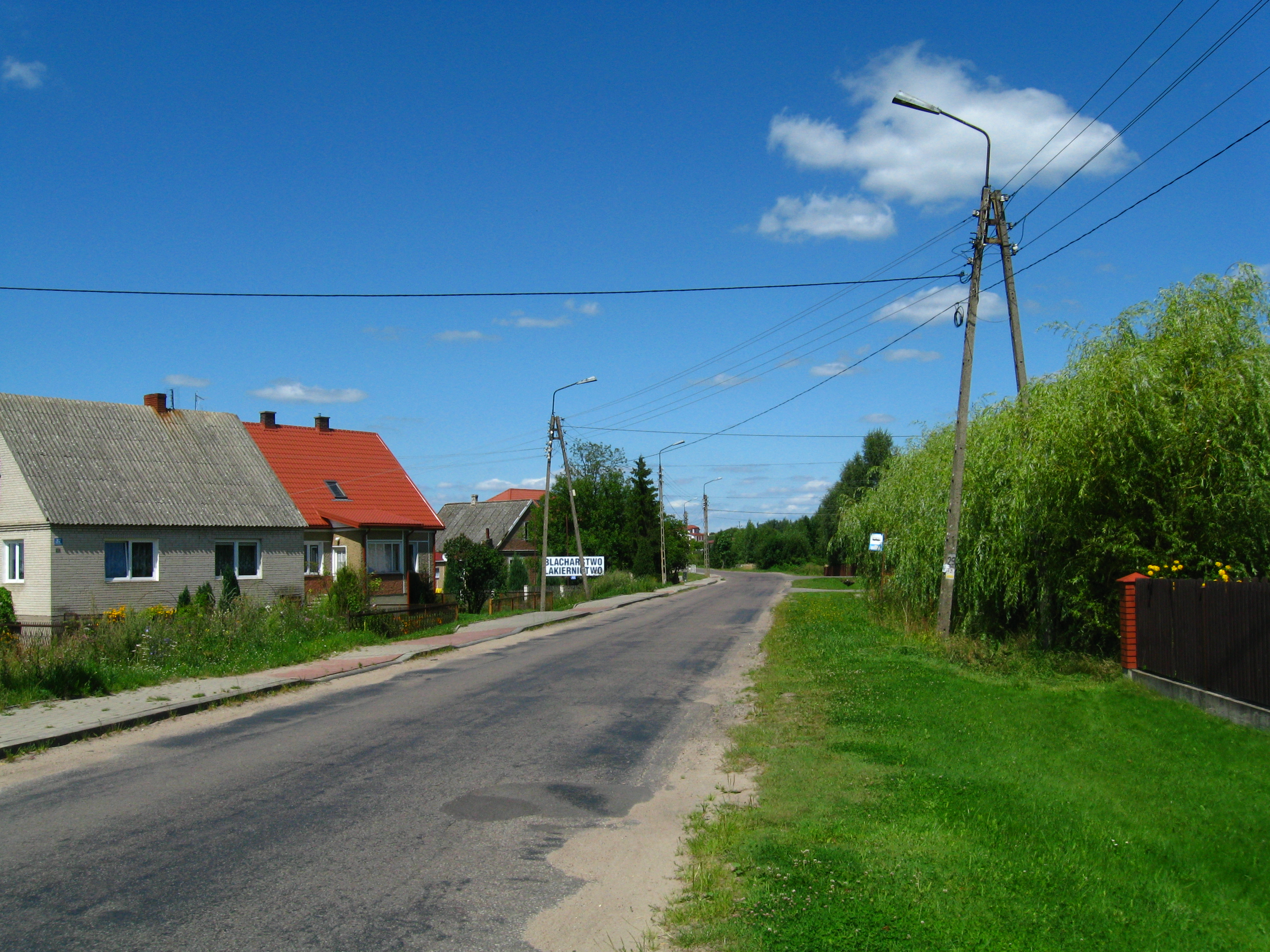
- National road in Dobrzyniewo Fabryczne

- Flag Coat of arms

- Location within Poland
- Coordinates: 53°11′07″N 23°03′51″E
- Country: Poland
- Voivodeship: Podlaskie
- County: Białystok
- Gmina: Dobrzyniewo Duże

Dobrzyniewo Fabryczne [dɔbʐɨˈɲɛvɔ faˈbrɨt͡ʂnɛ] is a village in the administrative district of Gmina Dobrzyniewo Duże, within Białystok County, Podlaskie Voivodeship, in north-eastern Poland.
