= Leńce =

- Village
- Location within Poland
- Coordinates: 53°11′21″N 23°5′45″E
- Country: Poland
- Voivodeship: Podlaskie
- County: Białystok
- Gmina: Dobrzyniewo Duże
- Population: 160

Leńce [ˈlɛɲt͡sɛ] is a village in the administrative district of Gmina Dobrzyniewo Duże, within Białystok County, Podlaskie Voivodeship, in north-eastern Poland.
