= Fasty =

- Village
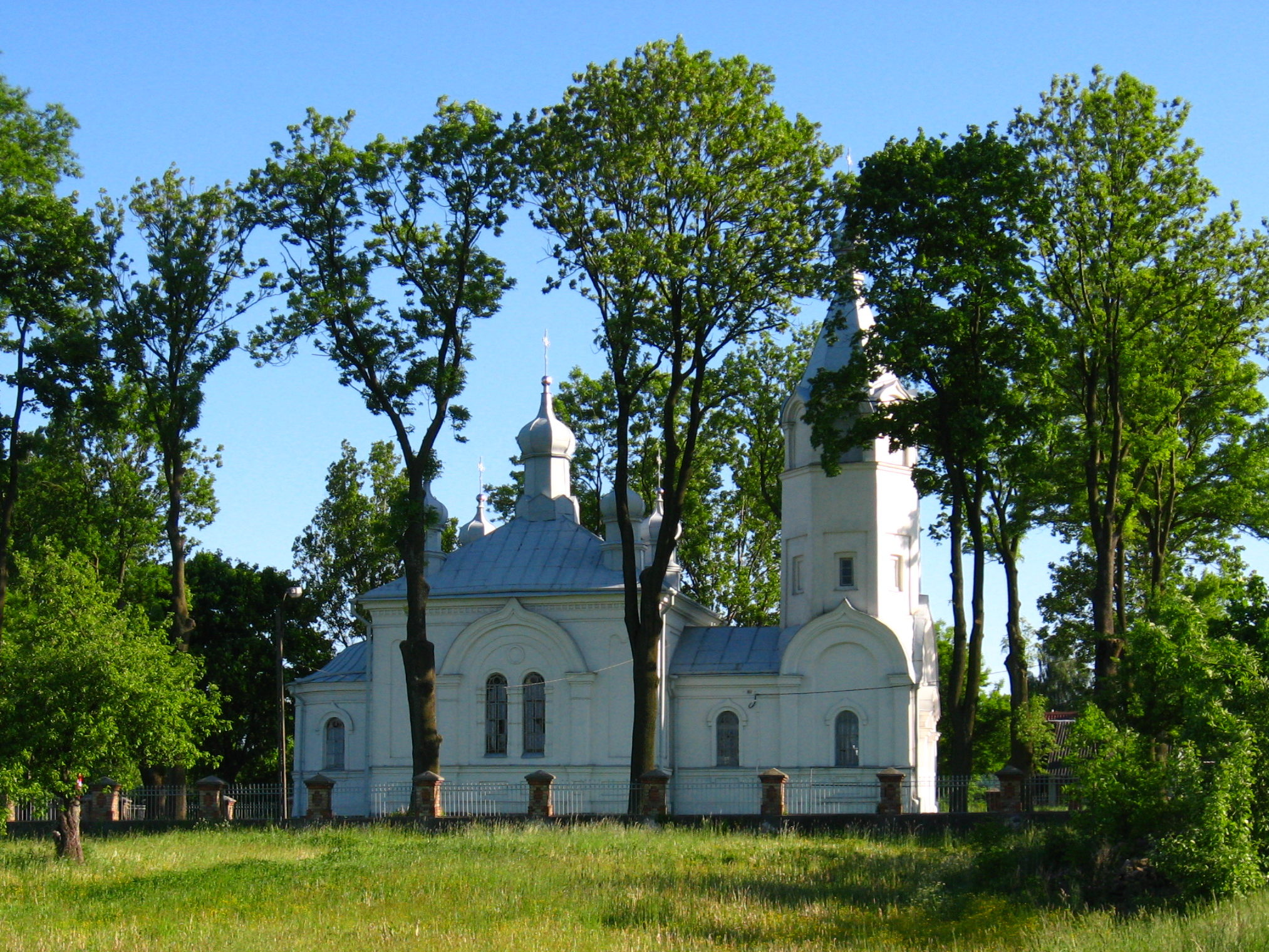
- Orthodox church

- Location within Poland
- Coordinates: 53°10′9″N 23°3′44″E
- Country: Poland
- Voivodeship: Podlaskie
- County: Białystok
- Gmina: Dobrzyniewo Duże
- Population: 1,000

Fasty [ˈfastɨ] is a village in the administrative district of Gmina Dobrzyniewo Duże, within Białystok County, Podlaskie Voivodeship, in north-eastern Poland.

== History ==
Shortly after the Red Army entered the area, on October 11, 1939, the NKVD made arrests of inhabitants of the village as enemies of the Soviet Union. Stanisław Horba arrested, tried and sentenced in 1939 to labor camps in the Russian North. He was released due to illness, and as a result he was sent to his wife, who was sent to Irtyshsk District (about 200 km (124 mi) from Pavlodar). Another resident Albin Horba, tried and sentenced to labor camps, was sent to the Republic of Komi. In 1942, he was released and joined the Anders' Army.

Following the establishment of the Polish People's Republic, some of the village's territory was incorporated over to the nearby city of Białystok in order to construct industrial area.
