= Nowe Aleksandrowo =

- Village
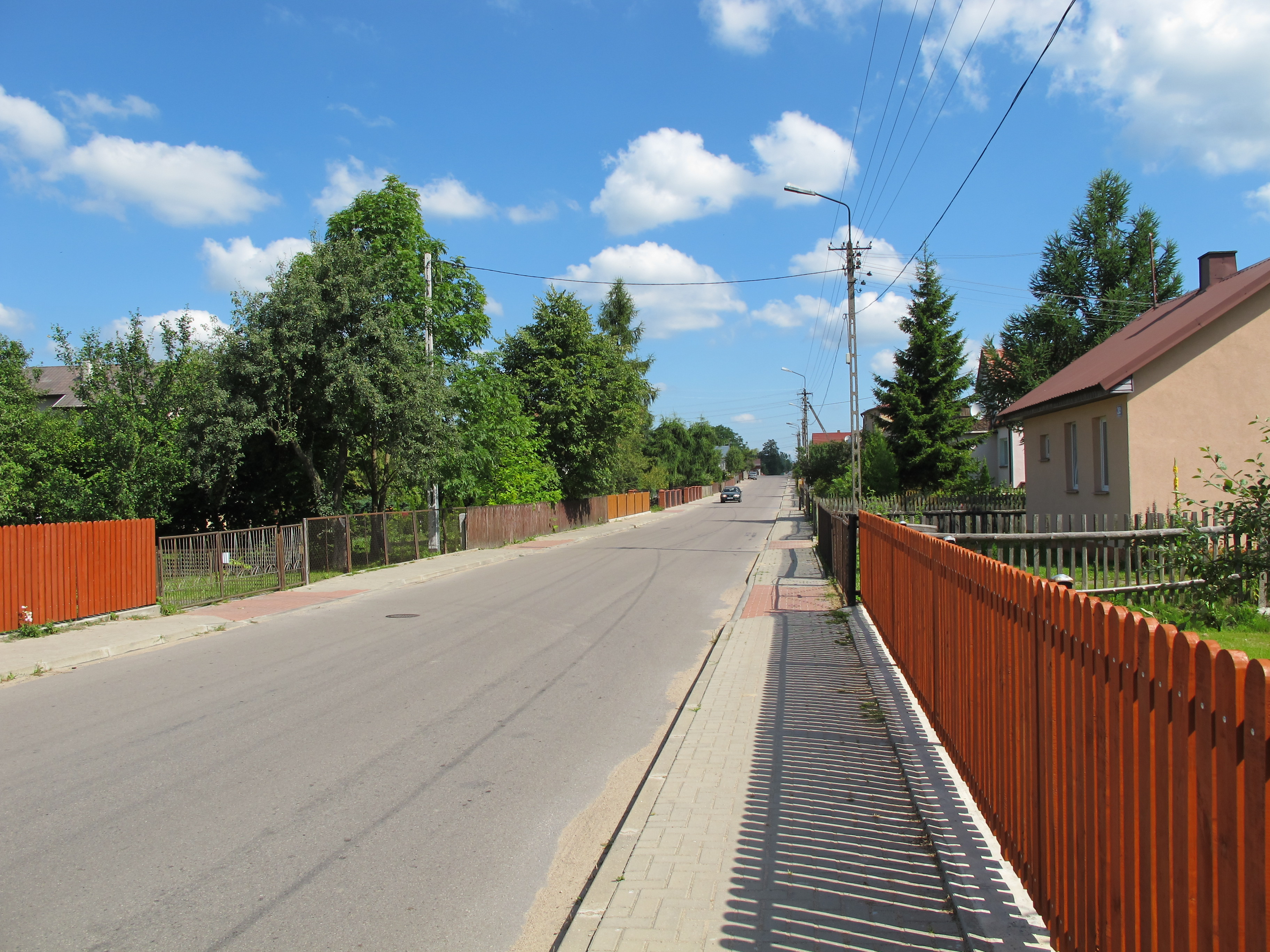
- View of Nowe Aleksandrowo in July 2010

- Location within Poland
- Coordinates: 53°11′N 23°4′E
- Country: Poland
- Voivodeship: Podlaskie
- County: Białystok
- Gmina: Dobrzyniewo Duże

Nowe Aleksandrowo [ˈnɔvɛ alɛksanˈdrɔvɔ] is a village in the administrative district of Gmina Dobrzyniewo Duże, within Białystok County, Podlaskie Voivodeship, in north-eastern Poland.
