= Pogorzałki, Podlaskie Voivodeship =

Pogorzałki
- Village
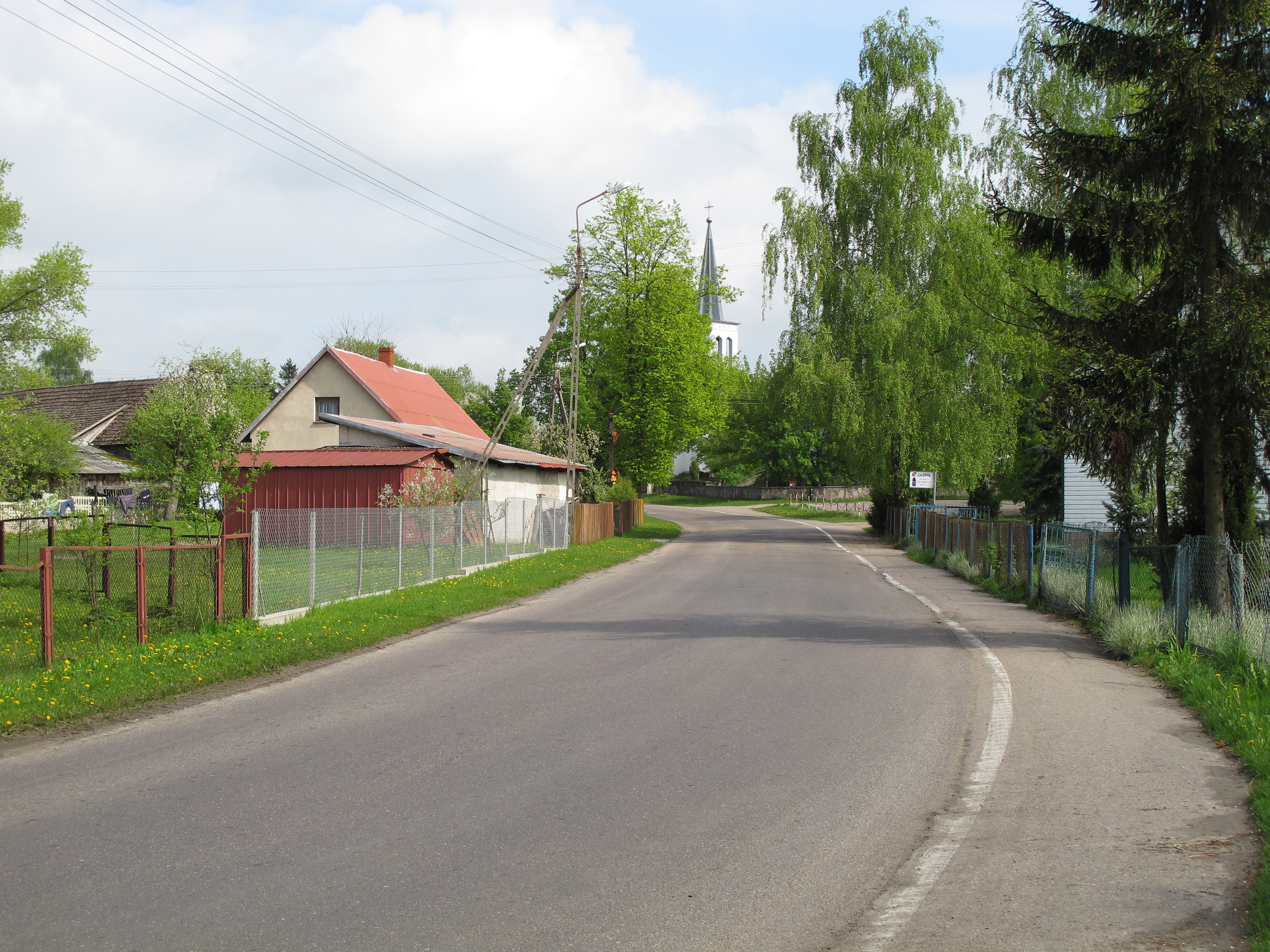

- Location within Poland
- Coordinates: 53°13′N 22°56′E
- Country: Poland
- Voivodeship: Podlaskie
- County: Białystok
- Gmina: Dobrzyniewo Duże
- Time zone: UTC+1 (CET)
  - Summer (DST): UTC+2 (CEST)
- Vehicle registration: BIA

Pogorzałki [pɔɡɔˈʐau̯ki] is a village in the administrative district of Gmina Dobrzyniewo Duże, within Białystok County, Podlaskie Voivodeship, in north-eastern Poland.

== History ==
During the invasion of Poland, which started World War II in September 1939, Pogorzałki was first briefly occupied by Germany, then by the Soviet Union from late September 1939, and by Germany from June 1941 to mid-1944. On 27 May 1944, the Germans arrested 49 Polish men, aged 15 to 60, with the intention of deporting them to concentration camps. During transport, in Tykocin and Białystok, some attempted to escape; ten succeeded, while others were either recaptured or killed. 36 were sent to concentration camps, of whom seven survived and returned to Pogorzałki after the war.
