= Bohdan, Podlaskie Voivodeship =

Bohdan
- Village
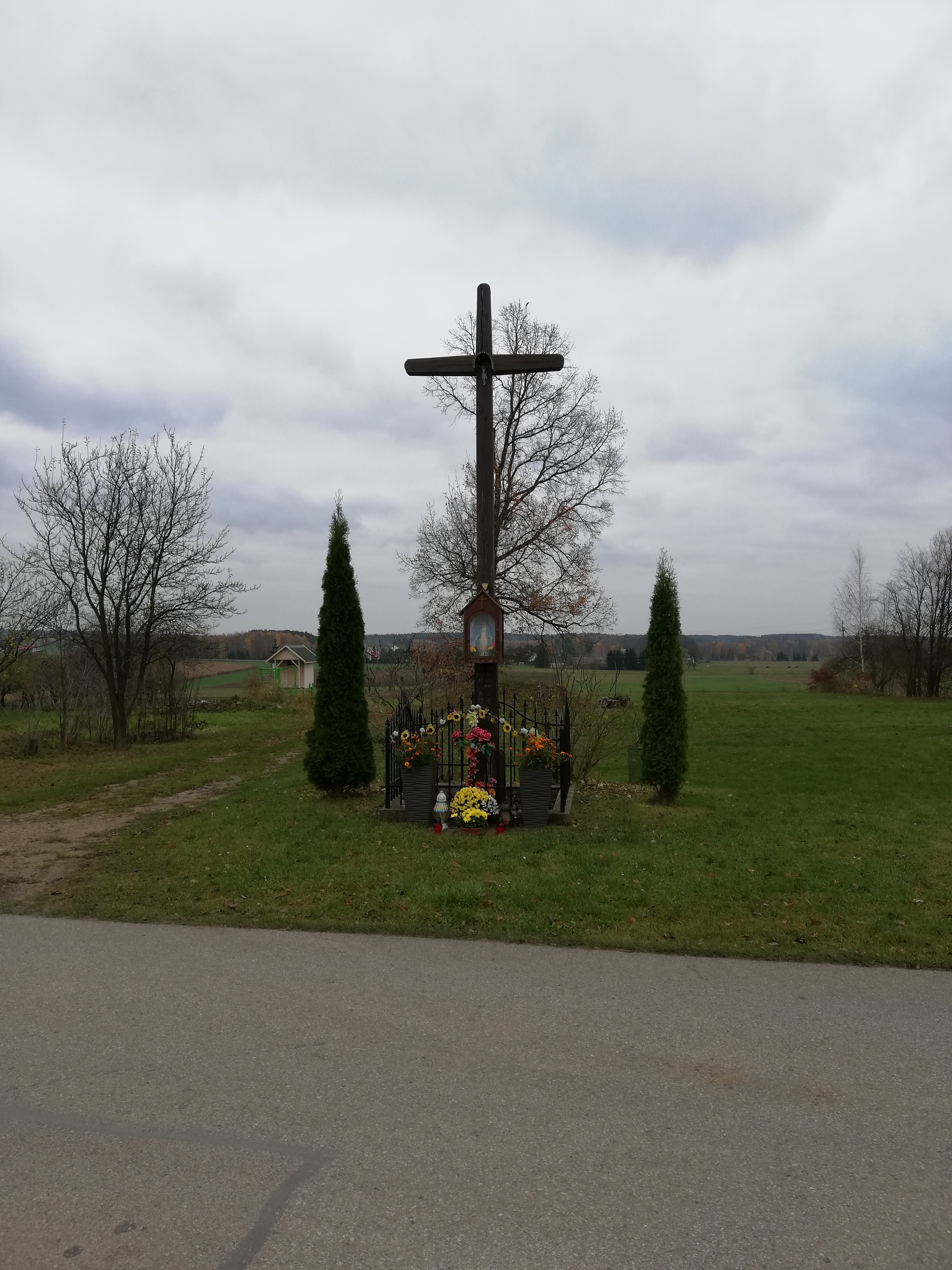

- Location within Poland
- Coordinates: 53°13′N 23°4′E
- Country: Poland
- Voivodeship: Podlaskie
- County: Białystok
- Gmina: Dobrzyniewo Duże

Bohdan (Polish pronunciation: [ˈbɔɣdan]) is a village in the administrative district of Gmina Dobrzyniewo Duże, within Białystok County, Podlaskie Voivodeship, in north-eastern Poland.
