= Letniki, Podlaskie Voivodeship =

Letniki
- Village
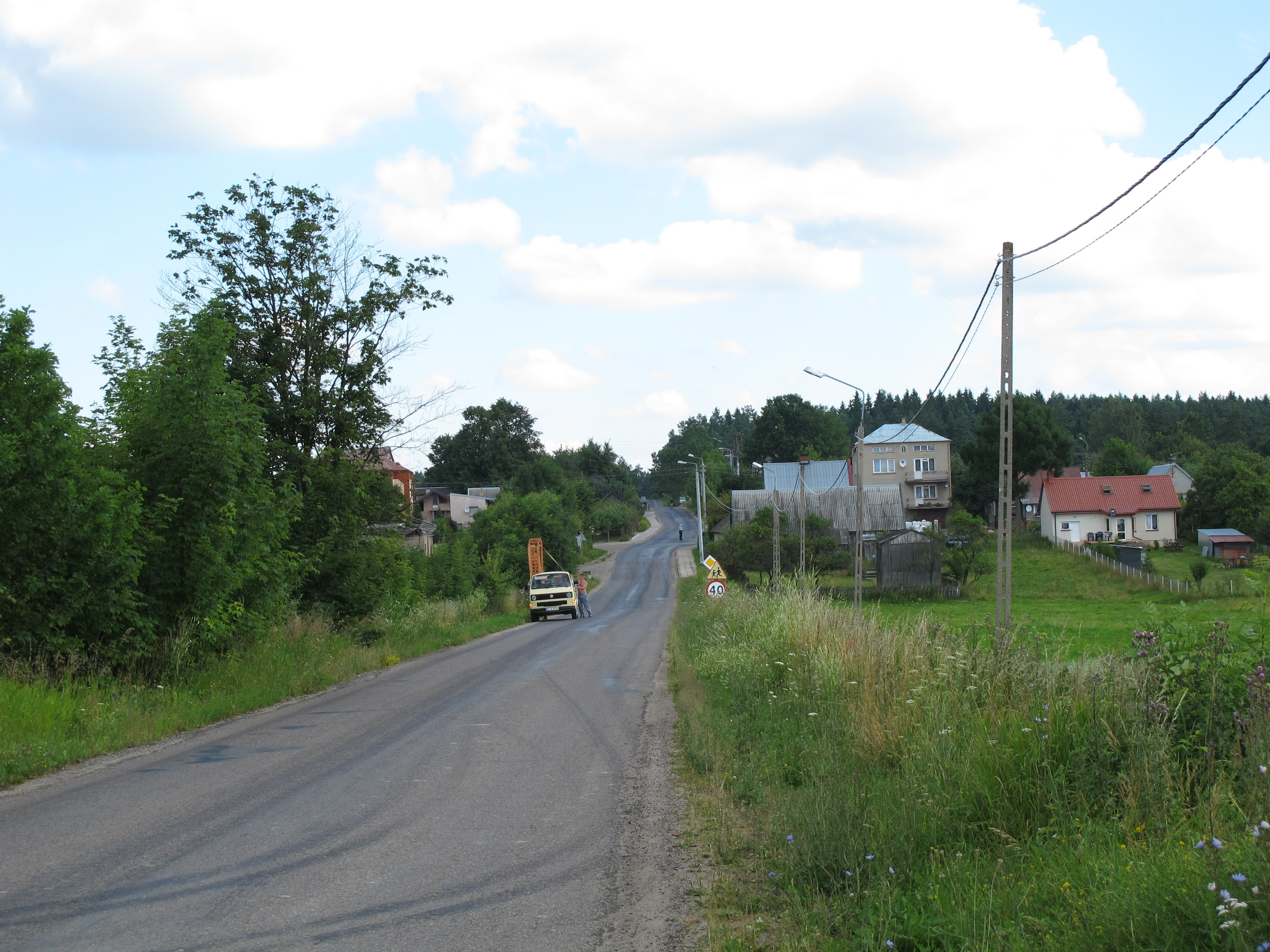
- View of Letniki in July 2010

- Location within Poland
- Coordinates: 53°14′N 23°5′E
- Country: Poland
- Voivodeship: Podlaskie
- County: Białystok
- Gmina: Dobrzyniewo Duże

Letniki [lɛtˈniki] is a village in the administrative district of Gmina Dobrzyniewo Duże, within Białystok County, Podlaskie Voivodeship, in north-eastern Poland.
