= Zalesie, Białystok County =

Zalesie
- Village
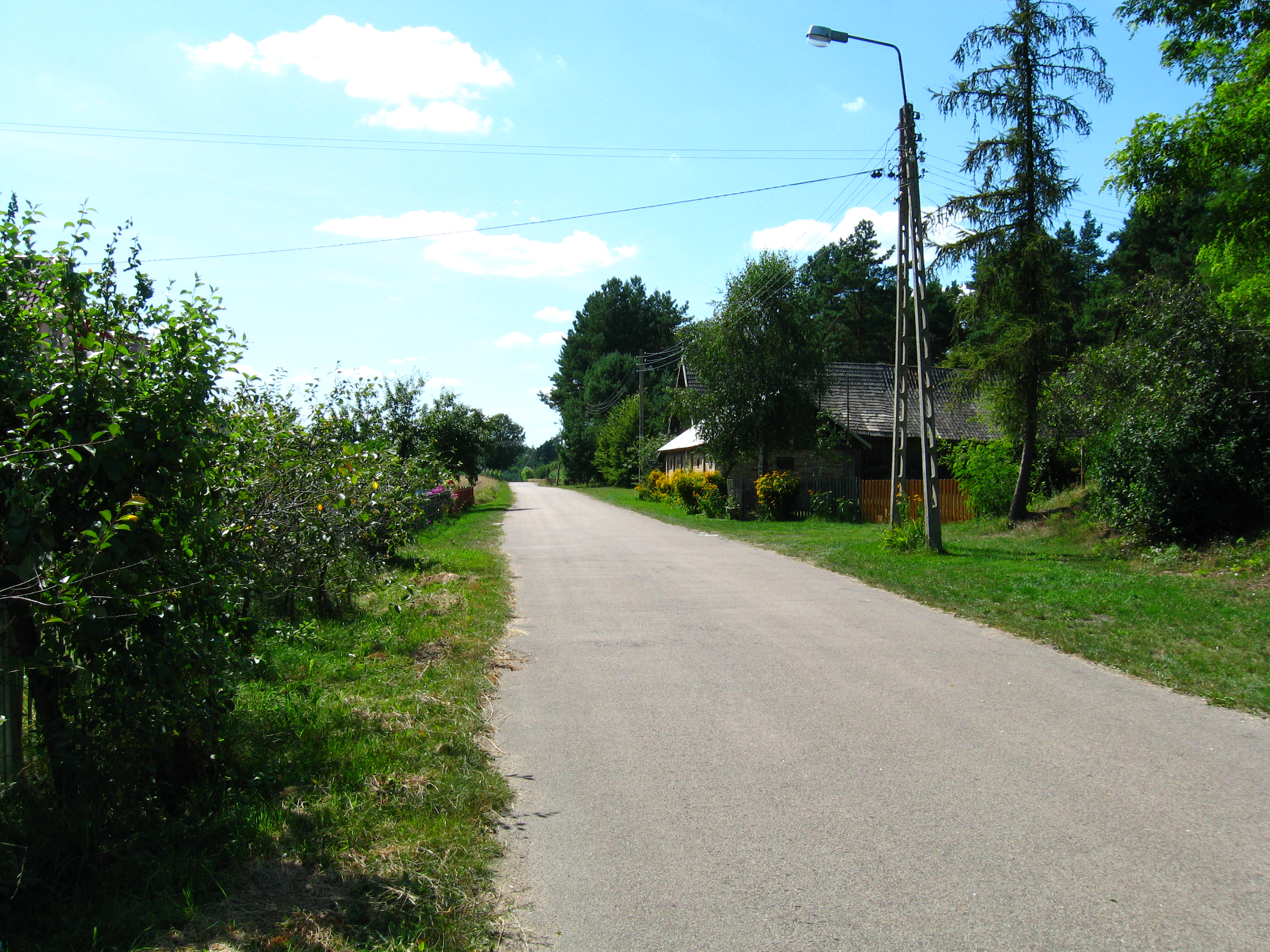

- Location within Poland
- Coordinates: 53°15′24″N 22°58′13″E
- Country: Poland
- Voivodeship: Podlaskie
- County: Białystok
- Gmina: Dobrzyniewo Duże
- Population: 78

Zalesie [zaˈlɛɕɛ] is a village in the administrative district of Gmina Dobrzyniewo Duże, within Białystok County, Podlaskie Voivodeship, in north-eastern Poland.
