= Jaworówka =

- Village
- Location within Poland
- Coordinates: 53°12′N 22°59′E
- Country: Poland
- Voivodeship: Podlaskie
- County: Białystok
- Gmina: Dobrzyniewo Duże
- Population: 120

Jaworówka [javɔˈrufka] is a village in the administrative district of Gmina Dobrzyniewo Duże, within Białystok County, Podlaskie Voivodeship, in north-eastern Poland.
