= Gniła, Podlaskie Voivodeship =

Gniła
- Village
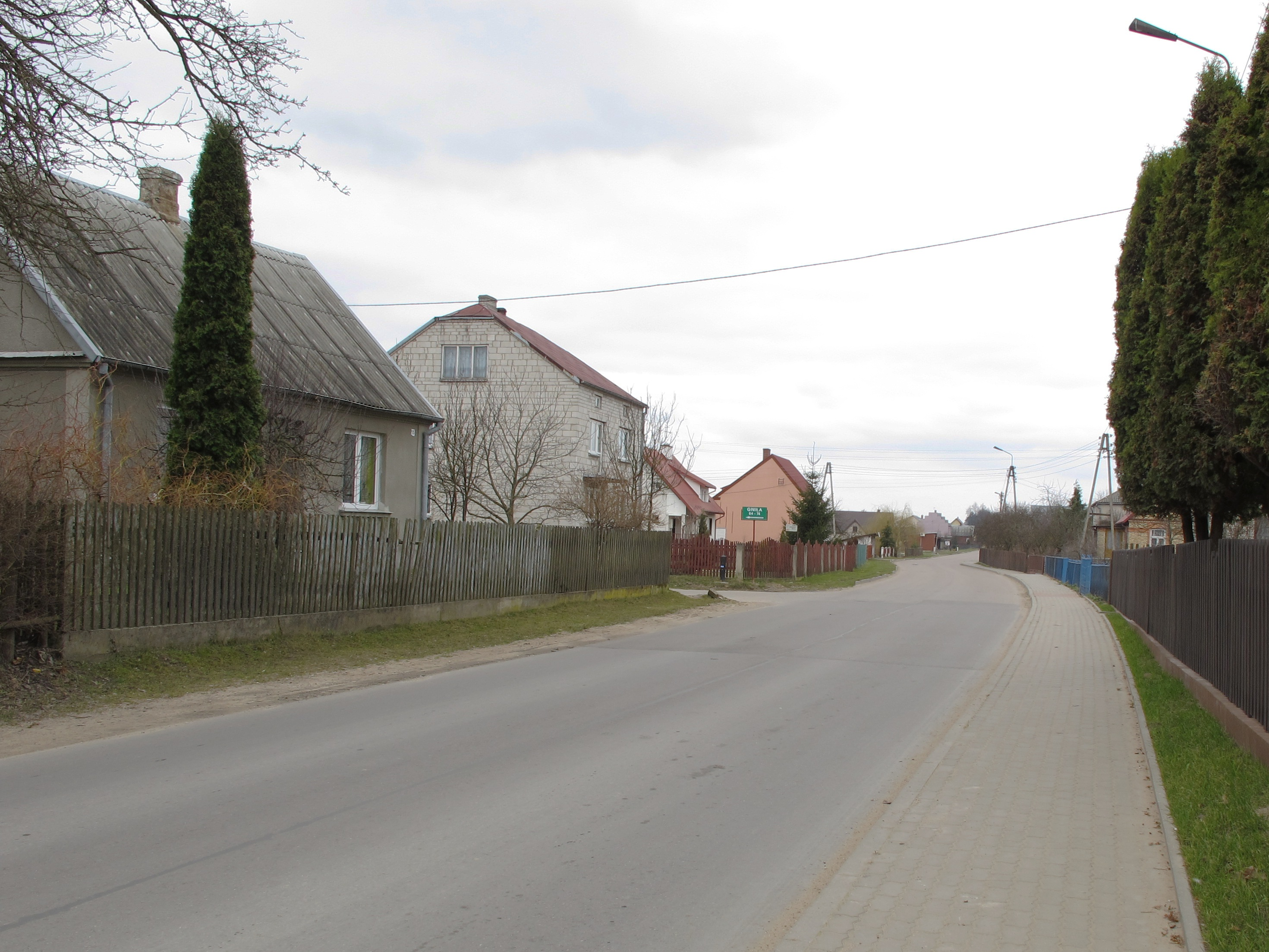

- Location within Poland
- Coordinates: 53°13′4″N 22°59′13″E
- Country: Poland
- Voivodeship: Podlaskie
- County: Białystok
- Gmina: Dobrzyniewo Duże
- Population: 490

Gniła [ˈɡniwa] is a village in the administrative district of Gmina Dobrzyniewo Duże, within Białystok County, Podlaskie Voivodeship, in north-eastern Poland.
