= Kozińce =

- Village
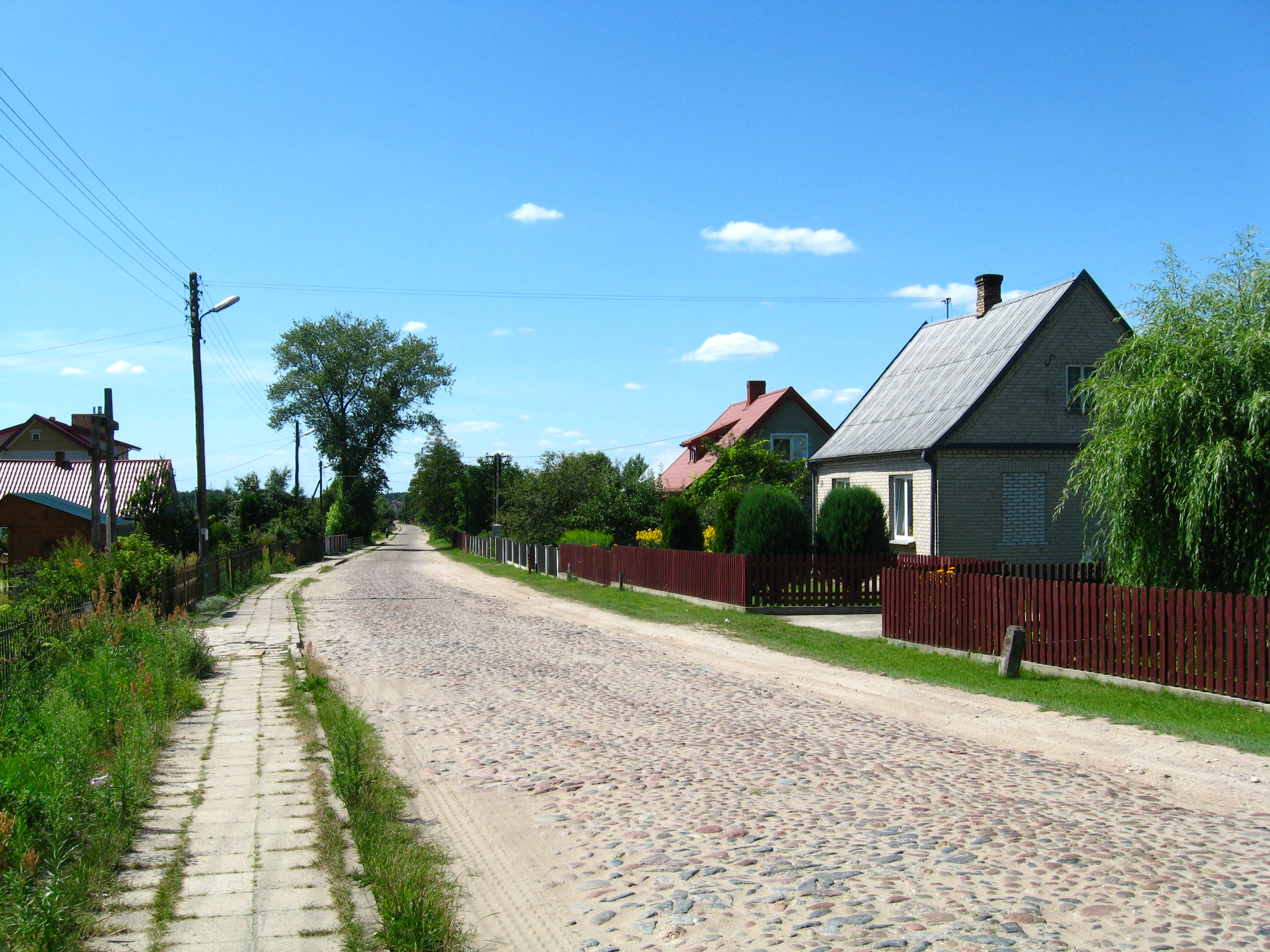

- Location within Poland
- Coordinates: 53°15′N 22°58′E
- Country: Poland
- Voivodeship: Podlaskie
- County: Białystok
- Gmina: Dobrzyniewo Duże

Kozińce [kɔˈʑiɲt͡sɛ] is a village in the administrative district of Gmina Dobrzyniewo Duże, within Białystok County, Podlaskie Voivodeship, in north-eastern Poland.
