= Dobrzyniewo Duże =

- Village
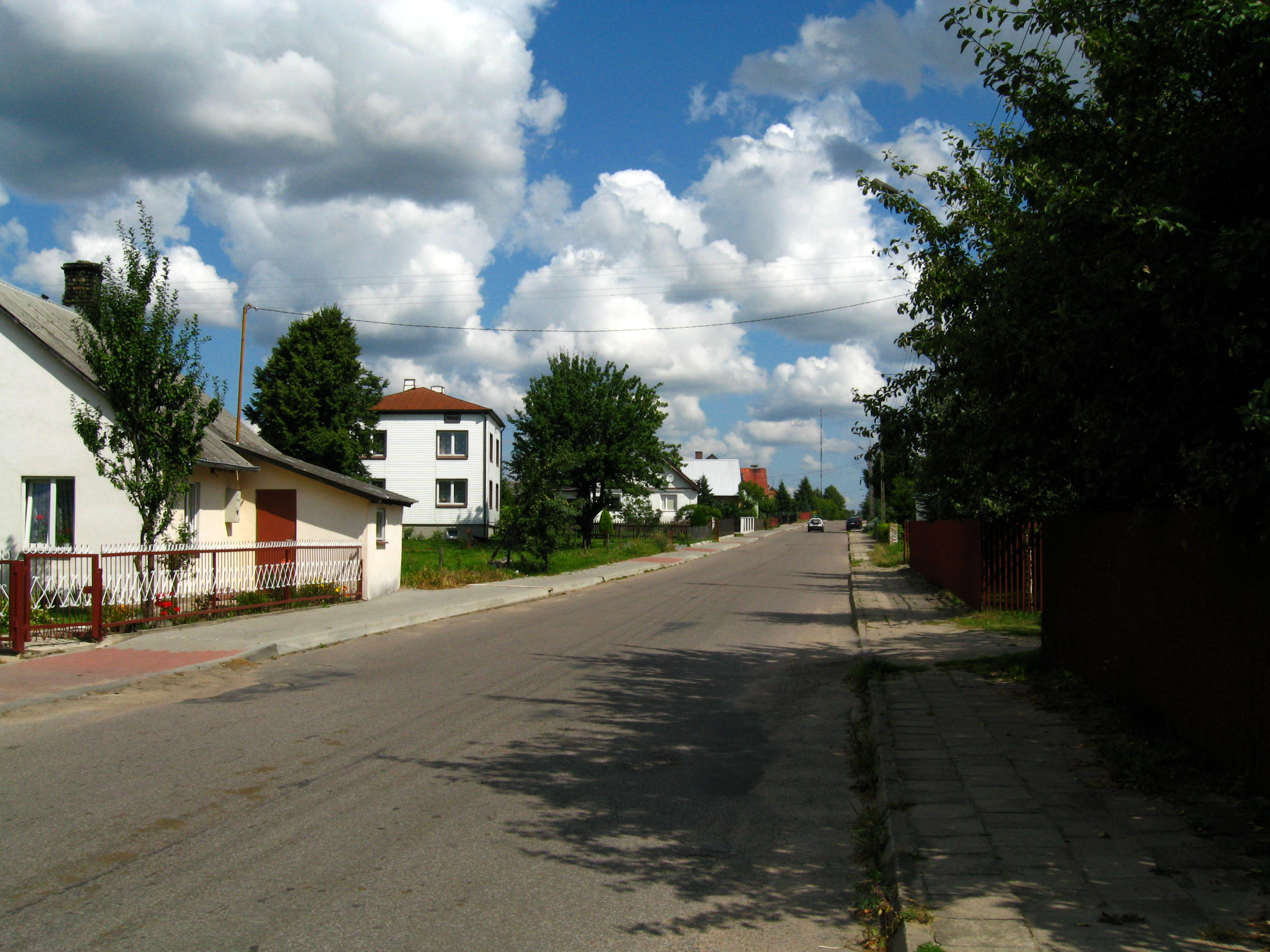

- Location within Poland
- Coordinates: 53°12′N 23°1′E
- Country: Poland
- Voivodeship: Podlaskie
- County: Białystok
- Gmina: Dobrzyniewo Duże
- Population: 1,200

Dobrzyniewo Duże [dɔbʐɨˈɲɛvɔ ˈduʐɛ] is a village in Białystok County, Podlaskie Voivodeship, in north-eastern Poland. It is the seat of the gmina (administrative district) called Gmina Dobrzyniewo Duże.
