= Gmina Dobrzyniewo Duże =

Gmina Dobrzyniewo Duże Dobrzyniewo Duże Commune
- Gmina
- Coat of arms

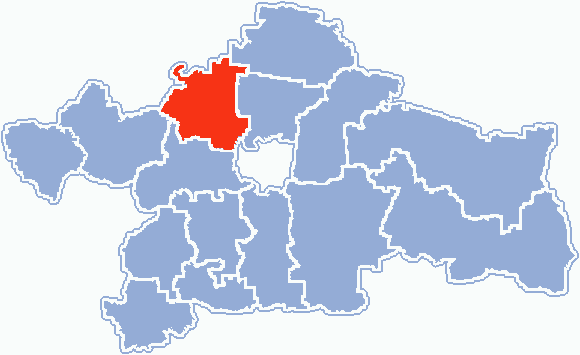
- Location within Białystok County
- Coordinates (Dobrzyniewo Duże): 53°12′N 23°1′E
- Country: Poland
- Voivodeship: Podlaskie
- County: Białystok County
- Seat: Dobrzyniewo Duże

Area
  - Total: 160.67 km^{2} (62.04 sq mi)

Population (2006)
  - Total: 7,933
  - Density: 49.37/km^{2} (127.9/sq mi)
- Website: http://www.dobrzyniewo.pl

Gmina Dobrzyniewo Duże is a rural gmina (administrative district) in Białystok County, Podlaskie Voivodeship, in north-eastern Poland. Its seat is the village of Dobrzyniewo Duże, which lies approximately 14 kilometres (9 mi) north-west of the regional capital Białystok.

The gmina covers an area of 160.67 square kilometres (62.0 sq mi), and as of 2006 its total population is 7,933.

== Villages ==
Gmina Dobrzyniewo Duże contains the villages and settlements of Bohdan, Borsukówka, Chraboły, Dobrzyniewo Duże, Dobrzyniewo Fabryczne, Dobrzyniewo Kościelne, Fasty, Gniła, Jaworówka, Kobuzie, Kopisk, Kozińce, Krynice, Kulikówka, Leńce, Letniki, Nowe Aleksandrowo, Nowosiółki, Obrubniki, Ogrodniki, Podleńce, Pogorzałki, Ponikła, Rybaki, Szaciły and Zalesie.

== Neighbouring gminas ==
Gmina Dobrzyniewo Duże is bordered by the city of Białystok and by the gminas of Choroszcz, Czarna Białostocka, Knyszyn, Krypno, Tykocin and Wasilków.
