= Białystok County =

Białystok County Powiat białostocki
- County
- Flag Coat of arms

- Coordinates (Białystok): 53°7′N 23°10′E
- Country: Poland
- Voivodeship: Podlaskie
- Seat: Białystok
- Gminas: Total 15: Gmina Choroszcz; Gmina Czarna Białostocka; Gmina Dobrzyniewo Duże; Gmina Gródek; Gmina Juchnowiec Kościelny; Gmina Łapy; Gmina Michałowo; Gmina Poświętne; Gmina Supraśl; Gmina Suraż; Gmina Turośń Kościelna; Gmina Tykocin; Gmina Wasilków; Gmina Zabłudów; Gmina Zawady

Area
  - Total: 2,984.64 km^{2} (1,152.38 sq mi)

Population (2019)
  - Total: 148,745
  - Density: 49.8368/km^{2} (129.077/sq mi)
  - Urban: 55,398
  - Rural: 93,347
- Car plates: BIA
- Website: www.powiatbialostocki.pl

Białystok County (Polish: powiat białostocki) is a unit of territorial administration and local government (powiat) in Podlaskie Voivodeship, north-eastern Poland, on the border with Belarus. It was created on 1 January 1999 as a result of the Polish local government reforms passed in 1998. Its administrative seat is the city of Białystok, although the city is not part of the county (it constitutes a separate city county).

The county contains nine towns: Łapy, 25 km (16 mi) southwest of Białystok, Czarna Białostocka, 22 km (14 mi) north of Białystok, Wasilków, 11 km (7 mi) north of Białystok, Choroszcz, 13 km (8 mi) west of Białystok, Supraśl, 16 km (10 mi) northeast of Białystok, Michałowo, 13 km (8 mi) east of Białystok, Zabłudów, 16 km (10 mi) southeast of Białystok, Tykocin, 29 km (18 mi) west of Białystok, and Suraż, 23 km (14 mi) southwest of Białystok.

The county covers an area of 2,984.64 square kilometres (1,152.4 sq mi), making it the largest county in Poland (ahead of Olsztyn County). As of 2019, its total population is 148,745, out of which the population of Łapy is 15,609, that of Czarna Białostocka is 9,318, that of Wasilków is 11,527, that of Choroszcz is 5,890, that of Supraśl is 4,605, that of Michałowo is 3,026, that of Zabłudów is 2,462, that of Tykocin is 1,973, that of Suraż is 988, and the rural population is 93,347.

== Neighbouring counties ==
Apart from the city of Białystok, Białystok County is bordered by Hajnówka County and Bielsk County to the south, Wysokie Mazowieckie County, Zambrów County and Łomża County to the west, Mońki County to the northwest, and Sokółka County to the northeast. It also borders Belarus to the east.

== Administrative divisions ==
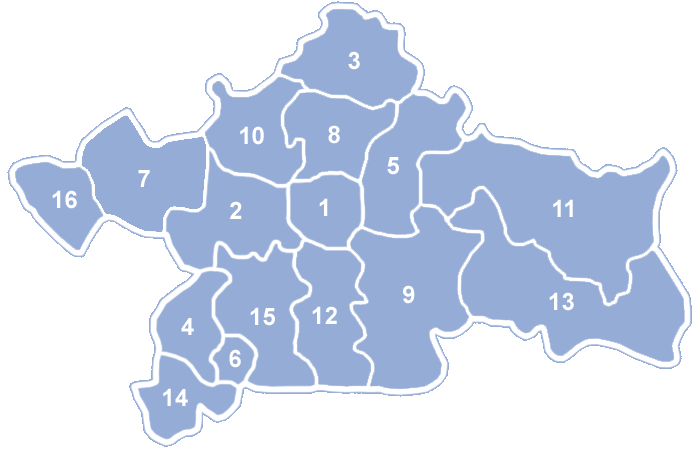
1. Białystok (not part of the county). Gminas: 2. Choroszcz, 3. Czarna Białostocka, 4. Łapy, 5. Supraśl, 6. Suraż, 7. Tykocin, 8. Wasilków, 9. Zabłudów, 10. Dobrzyniewo Duże, 11. Gródek, 12. Juchnowiec Kościelny, 13. Michałowo, 14. Poświętne, 15. Turośń Kościelna, 16. Zawady.

The county is subdivided into 15 gminas (nine urban-rural and six rural). These are listed in the following table, in descending order of population.

Gmina	Type	Area (km^{2})	Population (2019)	Seat
Gmina Łapy	urban-rural	127.6	21,920	Łapy
Gmina Wasilków	urban-rural	127.2	17,259	Wasilków
Gmina Juchnowiec Kościelny	rural	172.1	16,476	Juchnowiec Kościelny
Gmina Supraśl	urban-rural	188.0	15,393	Supraśl
Gmina Choroszcz	urban-rural	163.5	15,339	Choroszcz
Gmina Czarna Białostocka	urban-rural	206.5	11,377	Czarna Białostocka
Gmina Dobrzyniewo Duże	rural	160.7	9,377	Dobrzyniewo Duże
Gmina Zabłudów	urban-rural	339.8	9,280	Zabłudów
Gmina Michałowo	urban-rural	409.2	6,564	Michałowo
Gmina Turośń Kościelna	rural	140.3	6,316	Turośń Kościelna
Gmina Tykocin	urban-rural	207.3	6,216	Tykocin
Gmina Gródek	rural	430.6	5,163	Gródek
Gmina Poświętne	rural	114.3	3,398	Poświętne
Gmina Zawady	rural	112.7	2,714	Zawady
Gmina Suraż	urban-rural	76.6	1,953	Suraż

== Notable residents ==
- Konstanty Kalinowski (known in Belarus as Kastuś Kalinoŭski)(1838, Mostowlany – 1864), writer, journalist, lawyer and revolutionary
- Aliaksei Karpiuk (1920, Straszewo – 1992), Belarusian writer and public figure
