= Solniki =

Solniki may refer to the following places:

- Solniki, Lubusz Voivodeship (west Poland)
- Solniki, Białystok County in Podlaskie Voivodeship (north-east Poland)
- Solniki, Bielsk County in Podlaskie Voivodeship (north-east Poland)
