= Ostrówki =

Ostrówki may refer to the following places:

- Ostrówki, Łódź Voivodeship (central Poland)
- Ostrówki, Lublin Voivodeship (east Poland)
- Ostrówki, Podlaskie Voivodeship (north-east Poland)
- Ostrówki, Greater Poland Voivodeship (west-central Poland)
- Ostrówki, Warmian-Masurian Voivodeship (north Poland)
