= Kuriany =

Kuriany can refer to:

- Kuriany, Poland, a village in Podlaskie Voivodeship
- Kuriany, Ukraine, a village in Ternopil Oblast
