= Sieśki, Białystok County =

Sieśki
- Village
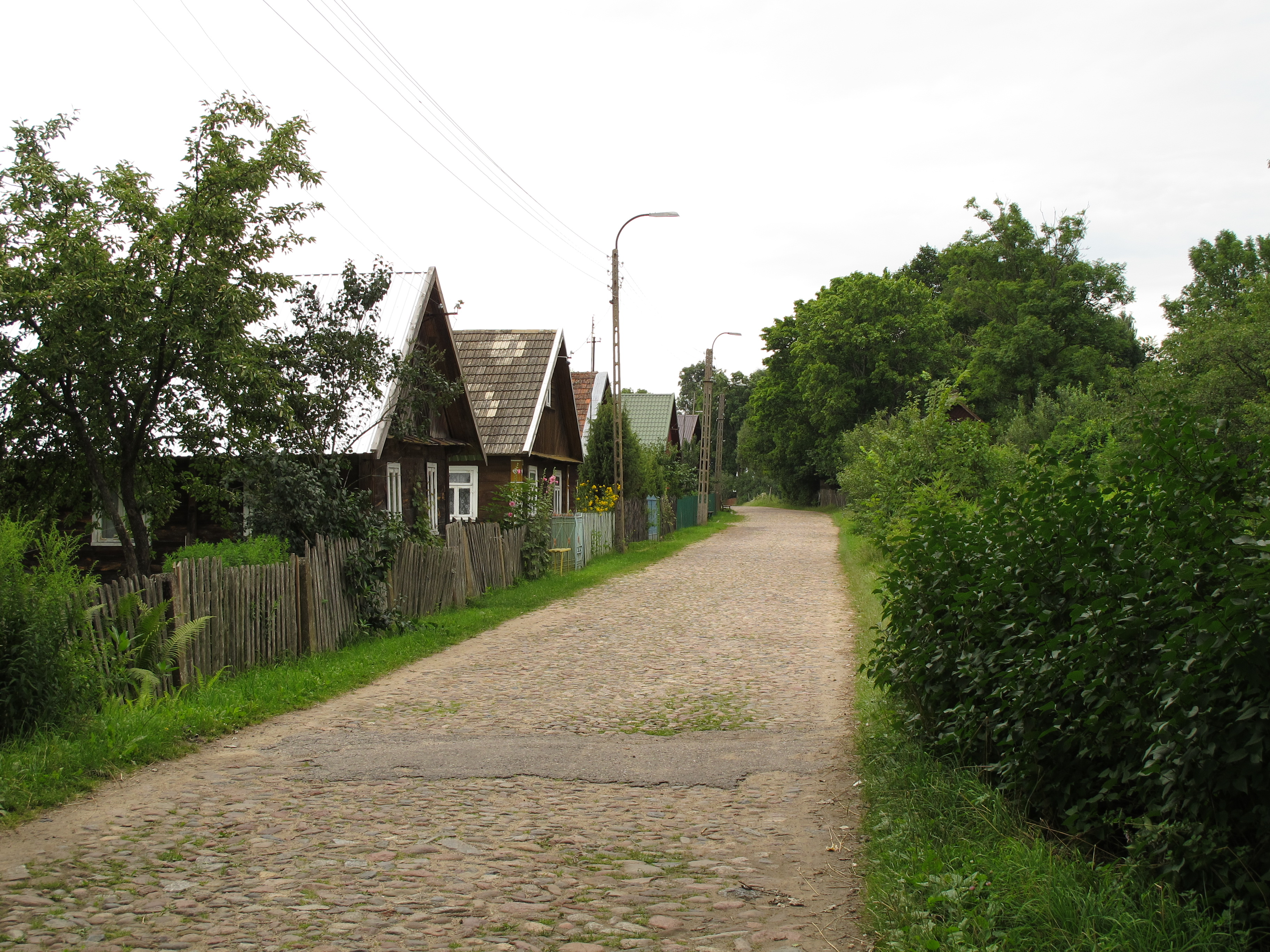

- Location within Poland
- Coordinates: 52°58′23″N 23°22′10″E
- Country: Poland
- Voivodeship: Podlaskie
- County: Białystok
- Gmina: Zabłudów

Sieśki [ˈɕɛɕki] is a village in the administrative district of Gmina Zabłudów, within Białystok County, Podlaskie Voivodeship, in north-eastern Poland.
