= Zacisze, Gmina Zabłudów =

Zacisze
- Village
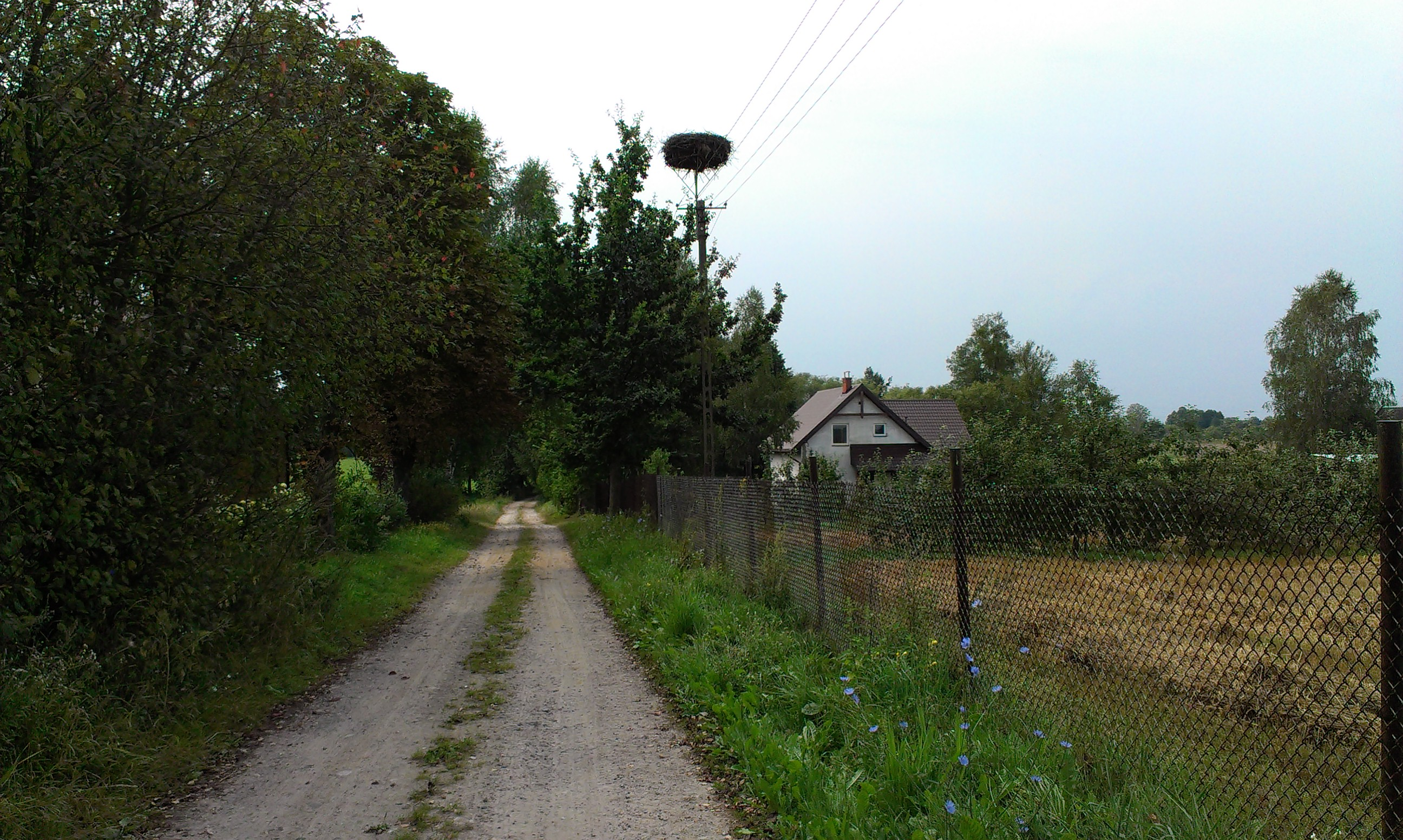

- Location within Poland
- Coordinates: 53°06′03″N 23°23′59″E
- Country: Poland
- Voivodeship: Podlaskie
- County: Białystok
- Gmina: Zabłudów

Zacisze [zaˈt͡ɕiʂɛ] is a village in the administrative district of Gmina Zabłudów, within Białystok County, Podlaskie Voivodeship, in north-eastern Poland.
