= Żuki, Gmina Zabłudów =

Żuki
- Village
- Location within Poland
- Coordinates: 53°0′53″N 23°15′6″E
- Country: Poland
- Voivodeship: Podlaskie
- County: Białystok
- Gmina: Zabłudów

Żuki [ˈʐukʲi] is a village in the administrative district of Gmina Zabłudów, within Białystok County, Podlaskie Voivodeship, in north-eastern Poland.
