= Laszki, Podlaskie Voivodeship =

Laszki
- Village
- Location within Poland
- Coordinates: 52°58′N 23°17′E
- Country: Poland
- Voivodeship: Podkarpackie
- County: Rzeszów
- Gmina: Laszki
- Population: 50

Laszki [ˈlaʂki] is a village in the administrative district of Gmina Zabłudów, within Białystok County, Podlaskie Voivodeship, in north-eastern Poland.
