= Kołpaki, Podlaskie Voivodeship =

Kołpaki
- Village
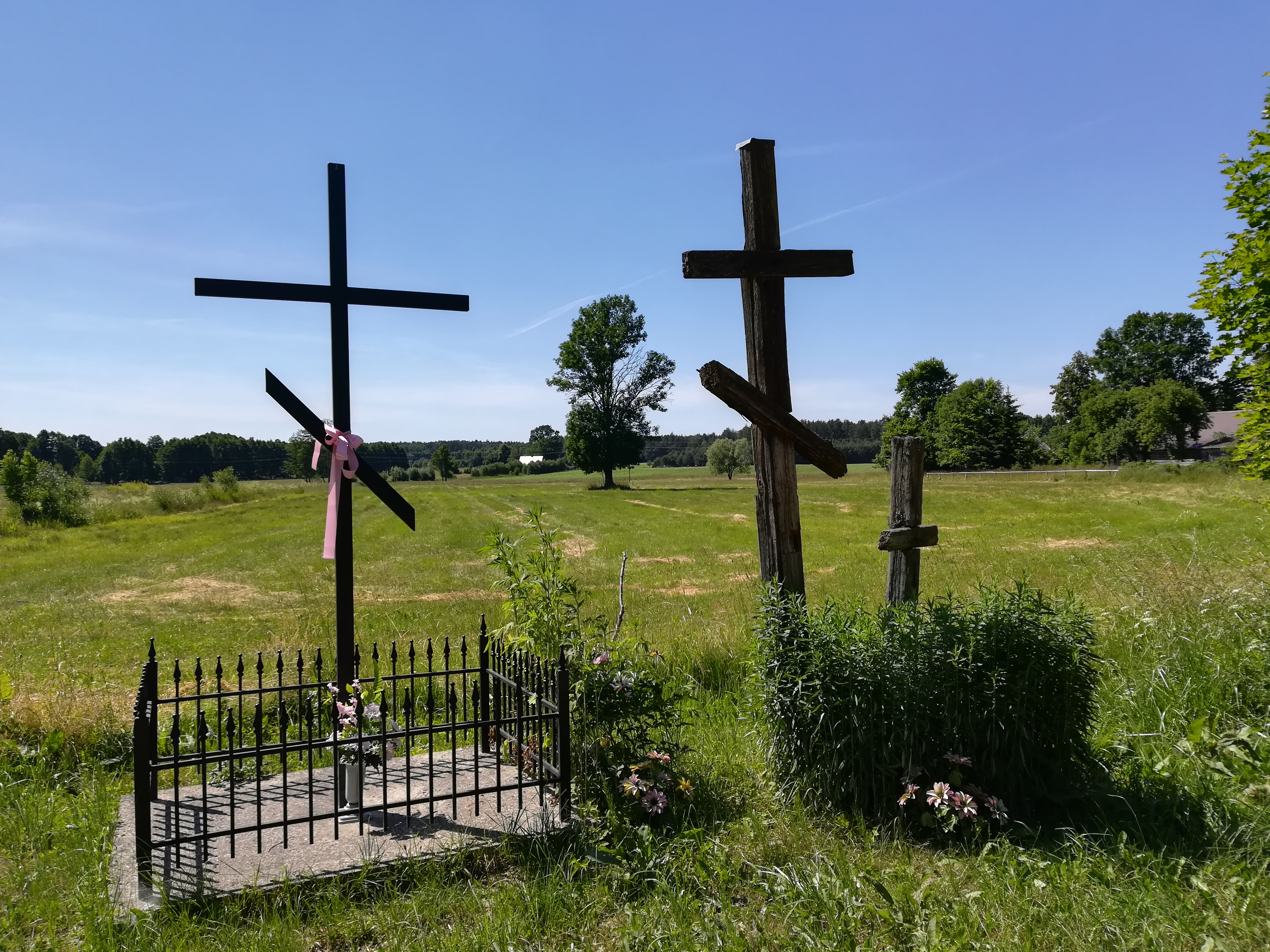
- Wayside orthodox cross in Kołpaki

- Location within Poland
- Coordinates: 52°59′N 23°27′E
- Country: Poland
- Voivodeship: Podlaskie
- County: Białystok
- Gmina: Zabłudów

Kołpaki [kɔu̯ˈpaki] is a village in the administrative district of Gmina Zabłudów, within Białystok County, Podlaskie Voivodeship, in north-eastern Poland.

According to the first census of 1921, Kołpaki had 100 inhabitants (53 women and 47 men) in 19 households. 70 people were of Eastern Orthodox denomination, with the remaining being of Roman Catholic denomination. 78 inhabitants declared Polish nationality, and 22 declared themselves as Belarusian.

The village was inhabited by 28 people in 2011.
