= Dobrzyniówka, Białystok County =

Dobrzyniówka
- Village
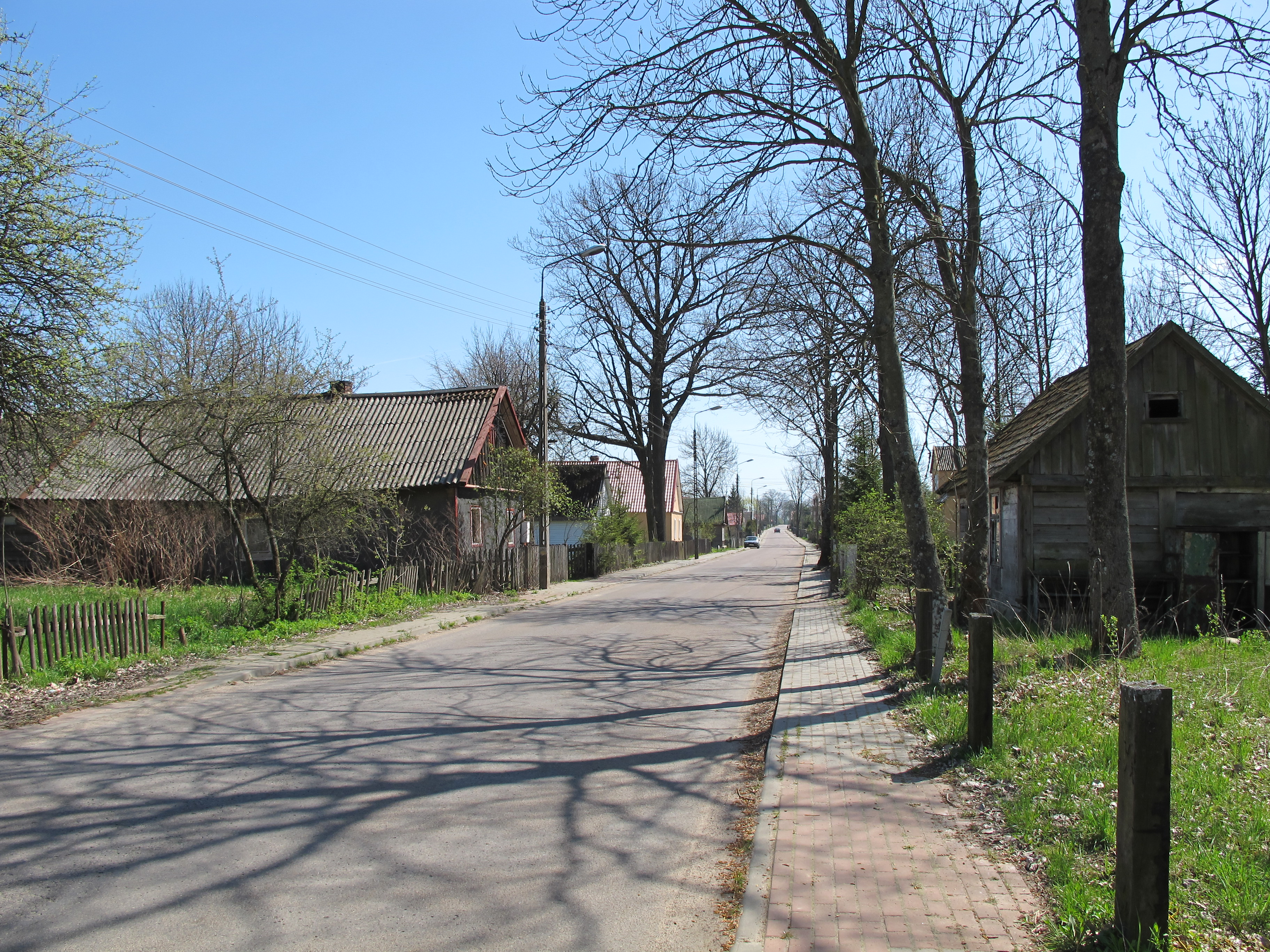

- Flag Coat of arms

- Location within Poland
- Coordinates: 53°02′44″N 23°21′56″E
- Country: Poland
- Voivodeship: Podlaskie
- County: Białystok
- Gmina: Zabłudów
- Population (2021): 687

Dobrzyniówka [dɔbʐɨˈɲufka] is a village in the administrative district of Gmina Zabłudów, within Białystok County, Podlaskie Voivodeship, in north-eastern Poland.
