= Krynickie =

- Village
- Location within Poland
- Coordinates: 52°59′N 23°15′E
- Country: Poland
- Voivodeship: Podlaskie
- County: Białystok
- Gmina: Zabłudów
- Population (approx.): 400

Krynickie (Polish pronunciation: [krɨˈɲitskʲɛ]) is a village in the administrative district of Gmina Zabłudów, within Białystok County, Podlaskie Voivodeship, in north-eastern Poland.
