= Gmina Zabłudów =

Gmina Zabłudów Zabłudów Commune
- Gmina
- Flag Coat of arms

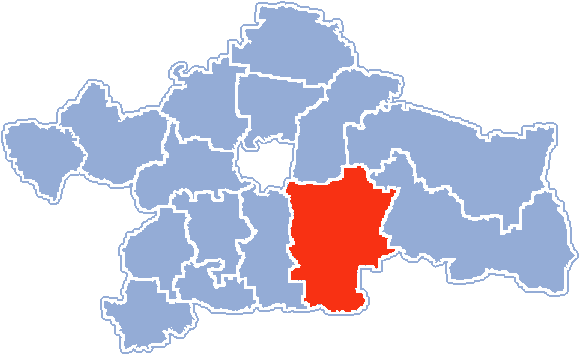
- Location within Białystok County
- Coordinates (Zabłudów): 53°1′N 23°20′E
- Country: Poland
- Voivodeship: Podlaskie
- County: Białystok County
- Seat: Zabłudów

Area
  - Total: 339.76 km^{2} (131.18 sq mi)

Population (2006)
  - Total: 8,451
  - Density: 24.87/km^{2} (64.42/sq mi)
  - Urban: 2,400
  - Rural: 6,051

Gmina Zabłudów is an urban-rural gmina (administrative district) in Białystok County, Podlaskie Voivodeship, in north-eastern Poland. Its seat is the town of Zabłudów, which lies approximately 16 kilometres (10 mi) south-east of the regional capital Białystok.

The gmina covers an area of 339.76 square kilometres (131.2 sq mi), and as of 2006 its total population is 8,451 (out of which the population of Zabłudów amounts to 2,400, and the population of the rural part of the gmina is 6,051).

== Villages ==
Apart from the town of Zabłudów, Gmina Zabłudów contains the villages and settlements of Aleksicze, Bobrowa, Ciełuszki, Dawidowicze, Dobrzyniówka, Dojlidy-Kolonia, Folwarki Małe, Folwarki Tylwickie, Folwarki Wielkie, Gnieciuki, Halickie, Kamionka, Kaniuki, Kołpaki, Kowalowce, Koźliki, Krynickie, Kucharówka, Kudrycze, Kuriany, Laszki, Łubniki, Łukiany, Małynka, Miniewicze, Nowosady, Ochremowicze, Olszanka, Ostrówki, Pasynki, Pawły, Płoskie, Protasy, Rafałówka, Ryboły, Rzepniki, Sieśki, Skrybicze, Solniki, Tatarowce, Zabłudów-Kolonia, Zacisze, Zagórki, Zagruszany, Zajezierce, Żuki, Zwierki and Żywkowo.

== Neighbouring gminas ==
Gmina Zabłudów is bordered by the city of Białystok and by the gminy of Bielsk Podlaski, Gródek, Juchnowiec Kościelny, Michałowo, Narew, and Supraśl.
