= Płoskie, Podlaskie Voivodeship =

Płoskie
- Village
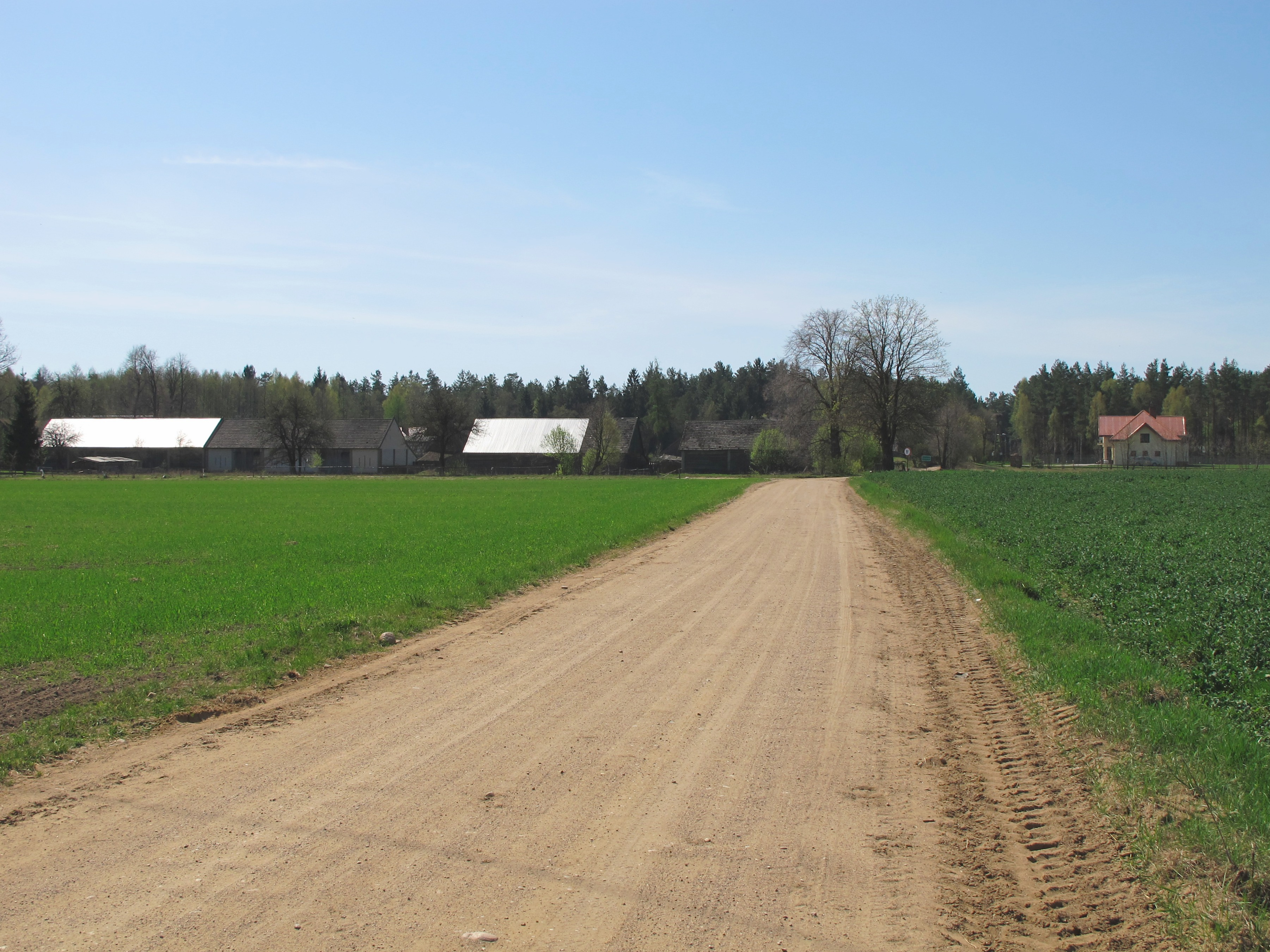

- Location within Poland
- Coordinates: 53°4′56″N 23°18′49″E
- Country: Poland
- Voivodeship: Podlaskie
- County: Białystok
- Gmina: Zabłudów

Płoskie [ˈpwɔskʲɛ] is a village in the administrative district of Gmina Zabłudów, within Białystok County, Podlaskie Voivodeship, in north-eastern Poland.
