= Koźliki, Białystok County =

Koźliki
- Village
- Location within Poland
- Coordinates: 53°01′30″N 23°18′30″E
- Country: Poland
- Voivodeship: Podlaskie
- County: Białystok
- Gmina: Zabłudów

Koźliki [kɔˈʑlʲikʲi] is a village in the administrative district of Gmina Zabłudów, within Białystok County, Podlaskie Voivodeship, in north-eastern Poland.
