= Bobrowa, Podlaskie Voivodeship =

Bobrowa
- Village
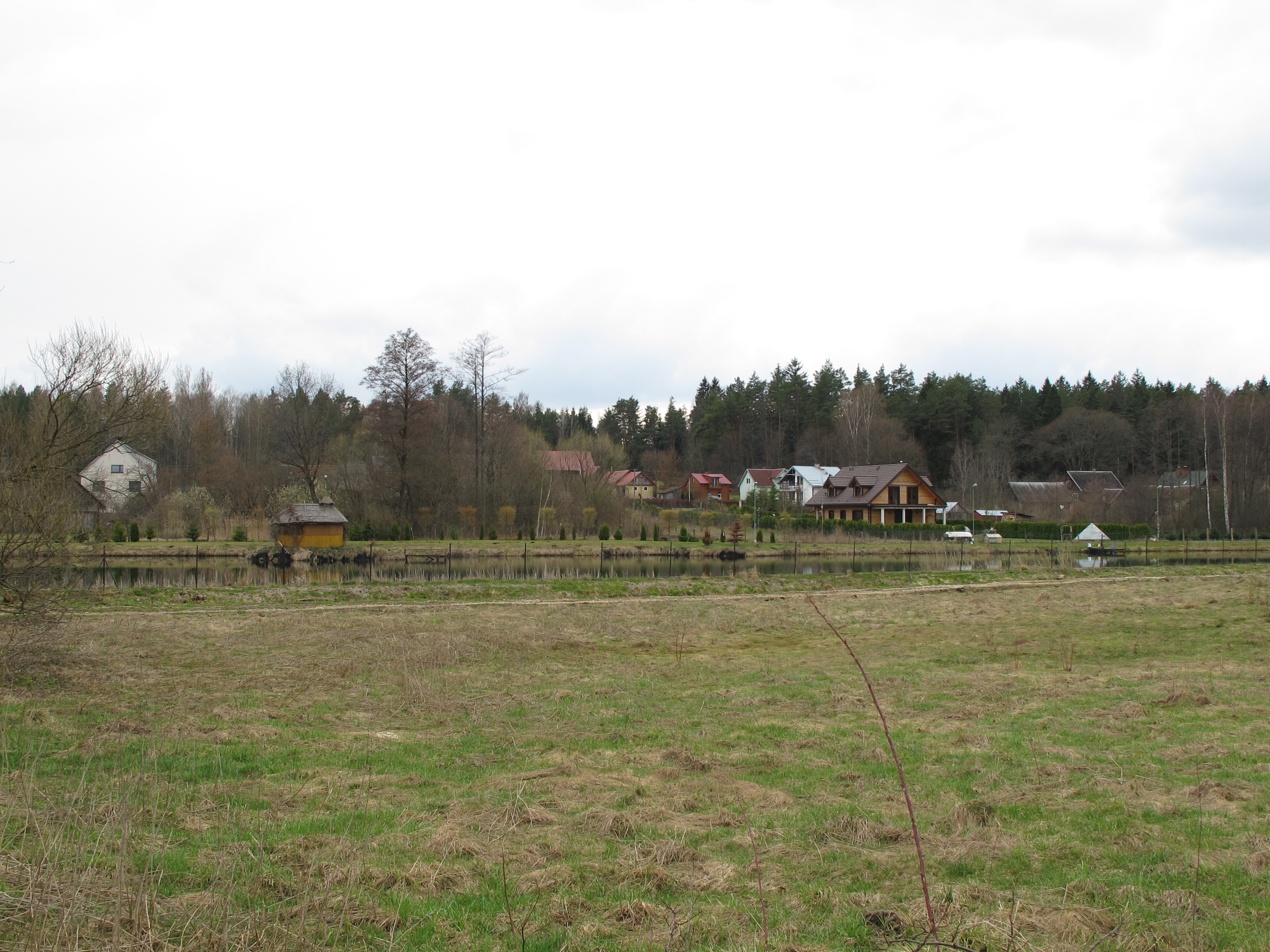

- Location within Poland
- Coordinates: 53°6′32.1″N 23°21′29.6″E
- Country: Poland
- Voivodeship: Podlaskie
- County: Białystok
- Gmina: Zabłudów
- Population (2021): 92

Bobrowa [bɔˈbrɔva] is a village in the administrative district of Gmina Zabłudów, within Białystok County, Podlaskie Voivodeship, in north-eastern Poland.
