= Tatarowce =

- Village
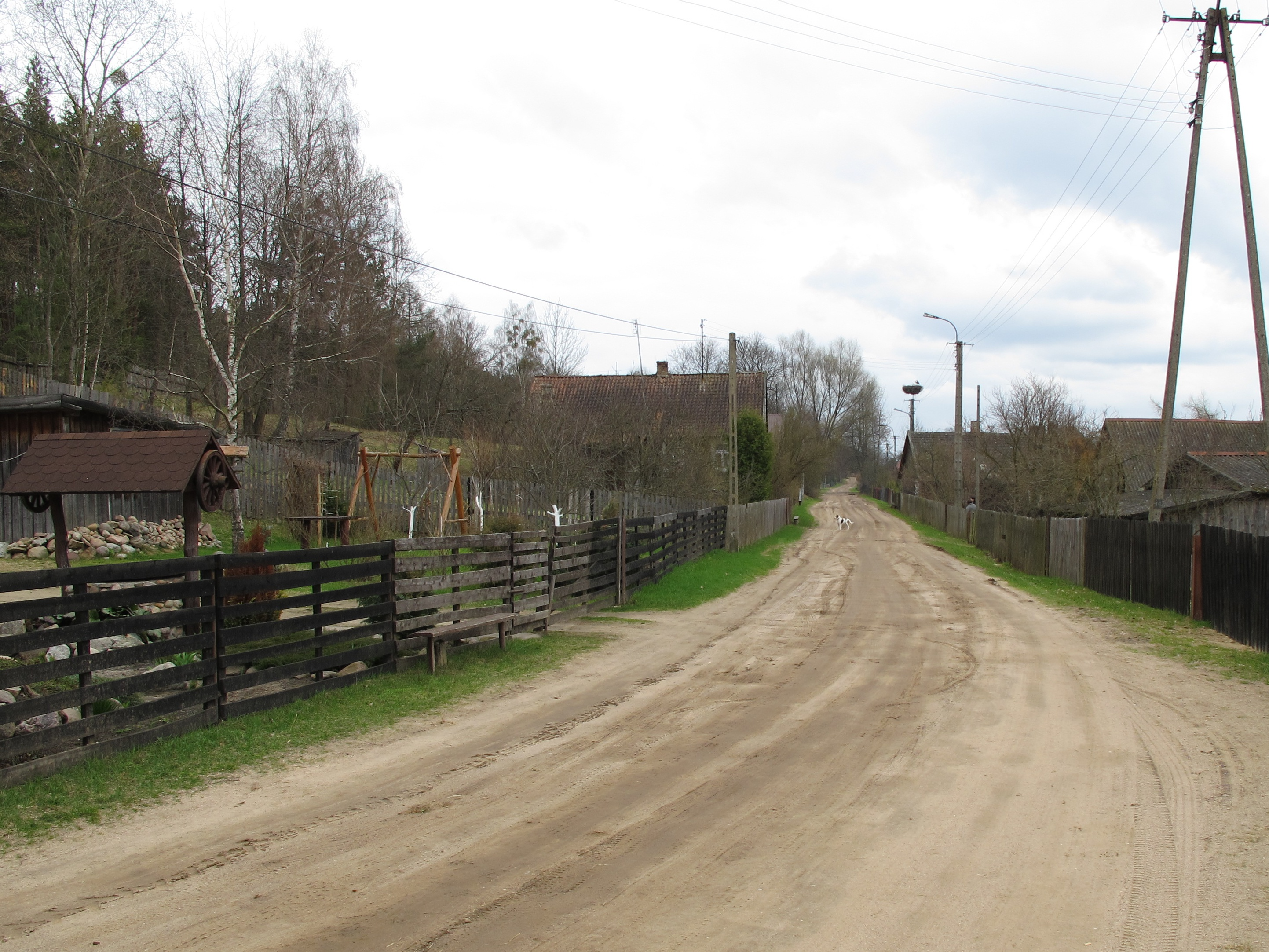

- Location within Poland
- Coordinates: 53°7′N 23°23′E
- Country: Poland
- Voivodeship: Podlaskie
- County: Białystok
- Gmina: Zabłudów

Tatarowce [tataˈrɔft͡sɛ] is a village in the administrative district of Gmina Zabłudów, within Białystok County, Podlaskie Voivodeship, in north-eastern Poland.
