= Kamionka, Białystok County =

Kamionka
- Village
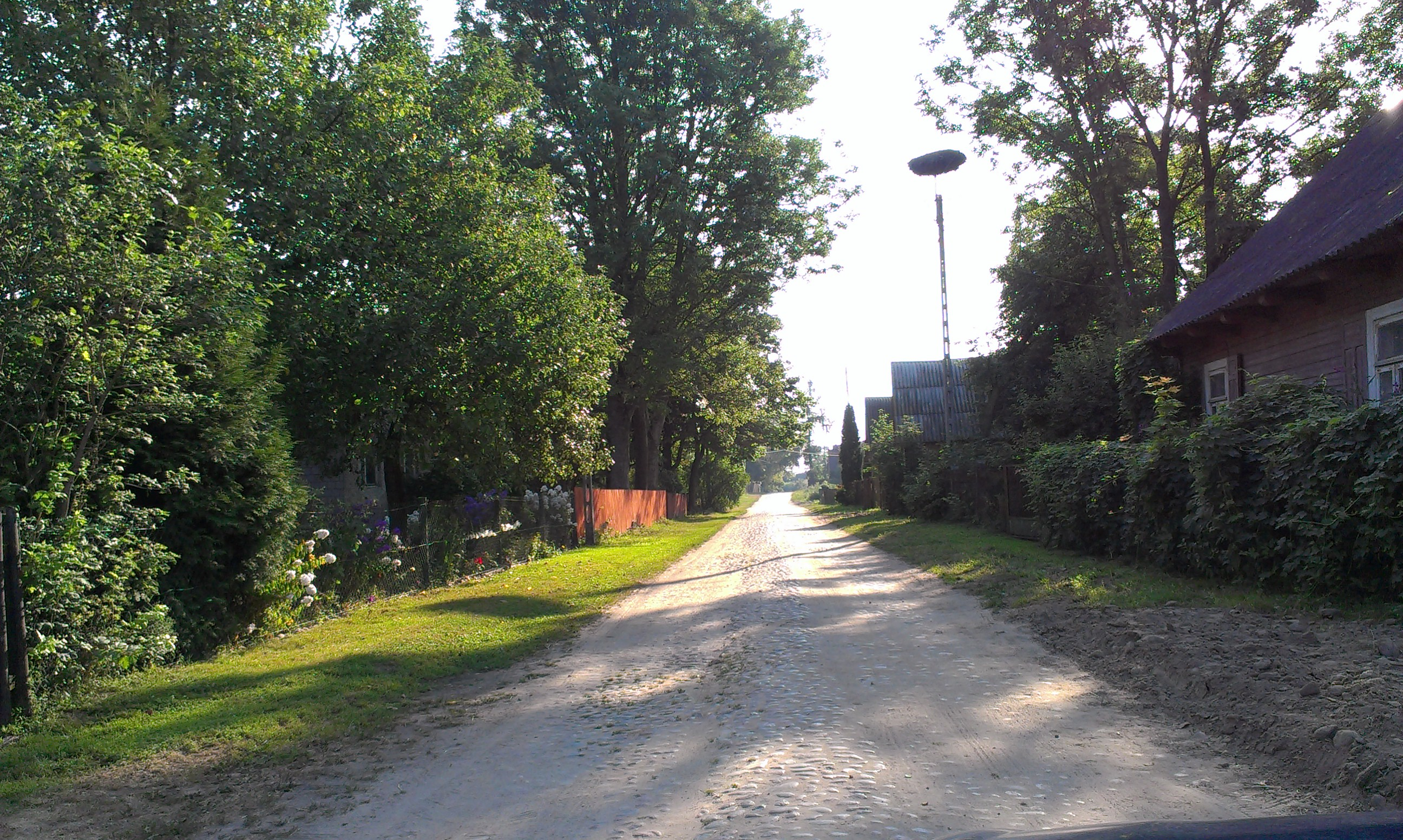

- Location within Poland
- Coordinates: 53°04′30″N 23°14′30″E
- Country: Poland
- Voivodeship: Podlaskie
- County: Białystok
- Gmina: Zabłudów

Kamionka [kaˈmjɔnka] is a village in the administrative district of Gmina Zabłudów, within Białystok County, Podlaskie Voivodeship, in north-eastern Poland.
