= Zagórki, Podlaskie Voivodeship =

Zagórki
- Village
- Location within Poland
- Coordinates: 53°5′51″N 23°14′9″E
- Country: Poland
- Voivodeship: Podlaskie
- County: Białystok
- Gmina: Zabłudów
- Population: 140

Zagórki [zaˈɡurki] is a village in the administrative district of Gmina Zabłudów, within Białystok County, Podlaskie Voivodeship, in north-eastern Poland.
