= Zabłudów-Kolonia =

- Village
- Location within Poland
- Coordinates: 53°01′30″N 23°20′30″E
- Country: Poland
- Voivodeship: Podlaskie
- County: Białystok
- Gmina: Zabłudów

Zabłudów-Kolonia [zaˈbwuduf kɔˈlɔɲa] is a village in the administrative district of Gmina Zabłudów, in Białystok County, Podlaskie Voivodeship, in north-eastern Poland.
