= Kudrycze =

- Village
- Location within Poland
- Coordinates: 53°3′N 23°13′E
- Country: Poland
- Voivodeship: Podlaskie
- County: Białystok
- Gmina: Zabłudów

Kudrycze [kuˈdrɨt͡ʂɛ] is a village in the administrative district of Gmina Zabłudów, within Białystok County, Podlaskie Voivodeship, in north-eastern Poland.
