= Pasynki, Białystok County =

Pasynki
- Village
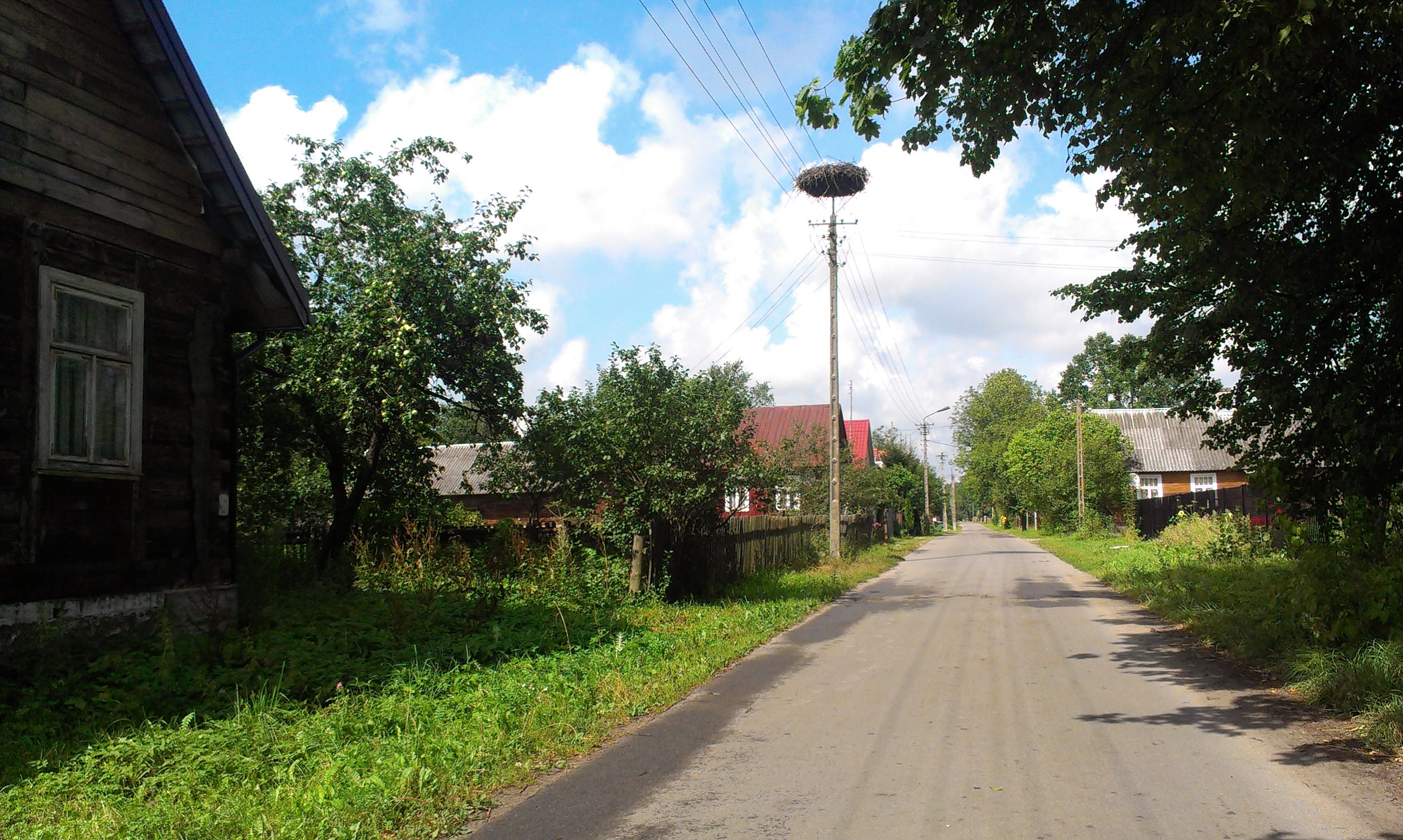

- Location within Poland
- Coordinates: 53°2′N 23°16′E
- Country: Poland
- Voivodeship: Podlaskie
- County: Białystok
- Gmina: Zabłudów

Pasynki [paˈsɨŋki] is a village in the administrative district of Gmina Zabłudów, within Białystok County, Podlaskie Voivodeship, in north-eastern Poland.
