= Folwarki Wielkie =

- Village
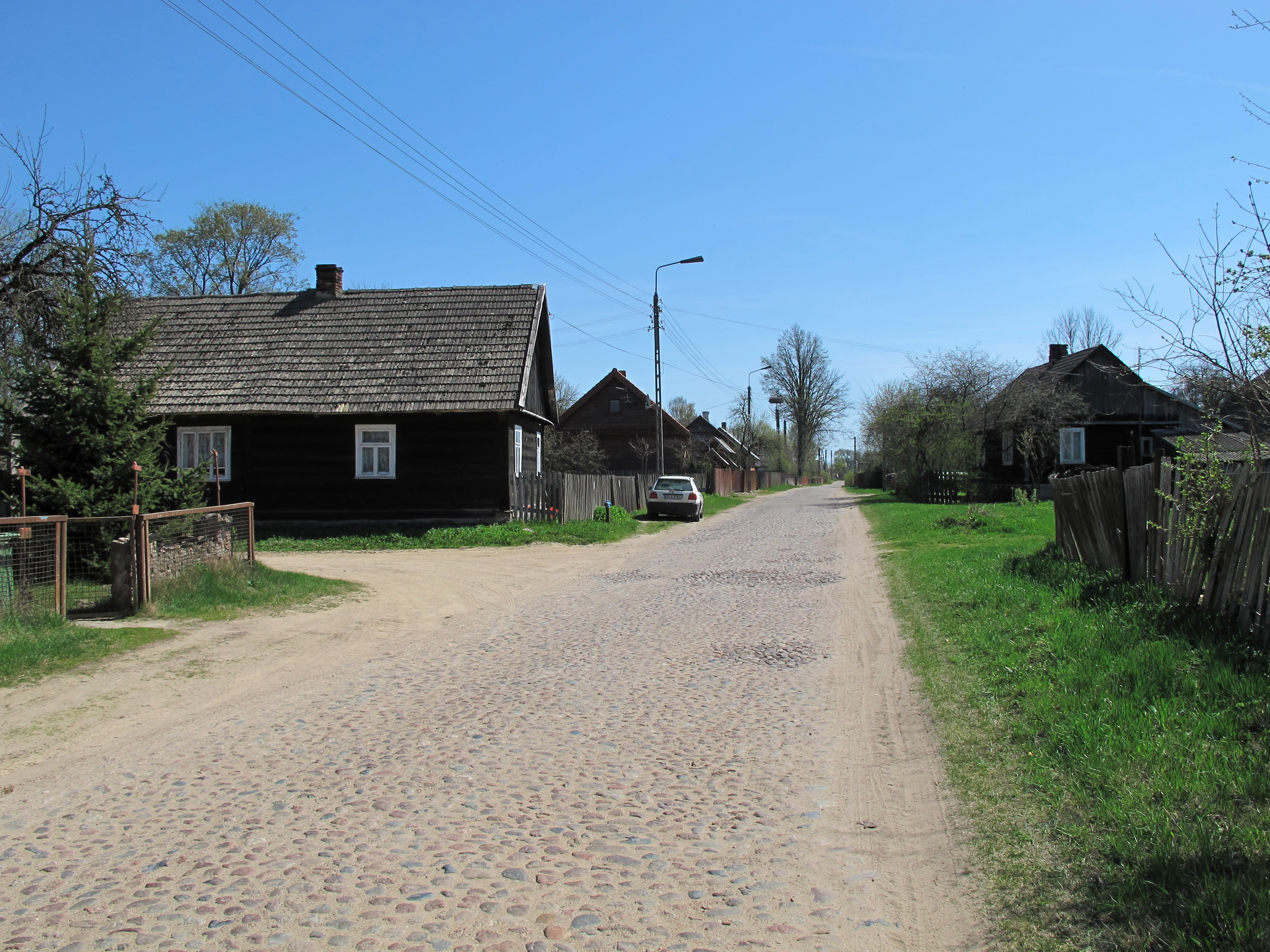

- Location within Poland
- Coordinates: 53°1′N 23°26′E
- Country: Poland
- Voivodeship: Podlaskie
- County: Białystok
- Gmina: Zabłudów
- Population (2021): 128

Folwarki Wielkie [fɔlˈvarki ˈvjɛlkʲɛ] is a village in the administrative district of Gmina Zabłudów, within Białystok County, Podlaskie Voivodeship, in north-eastern Poland.
