= Ryboły =

- Village
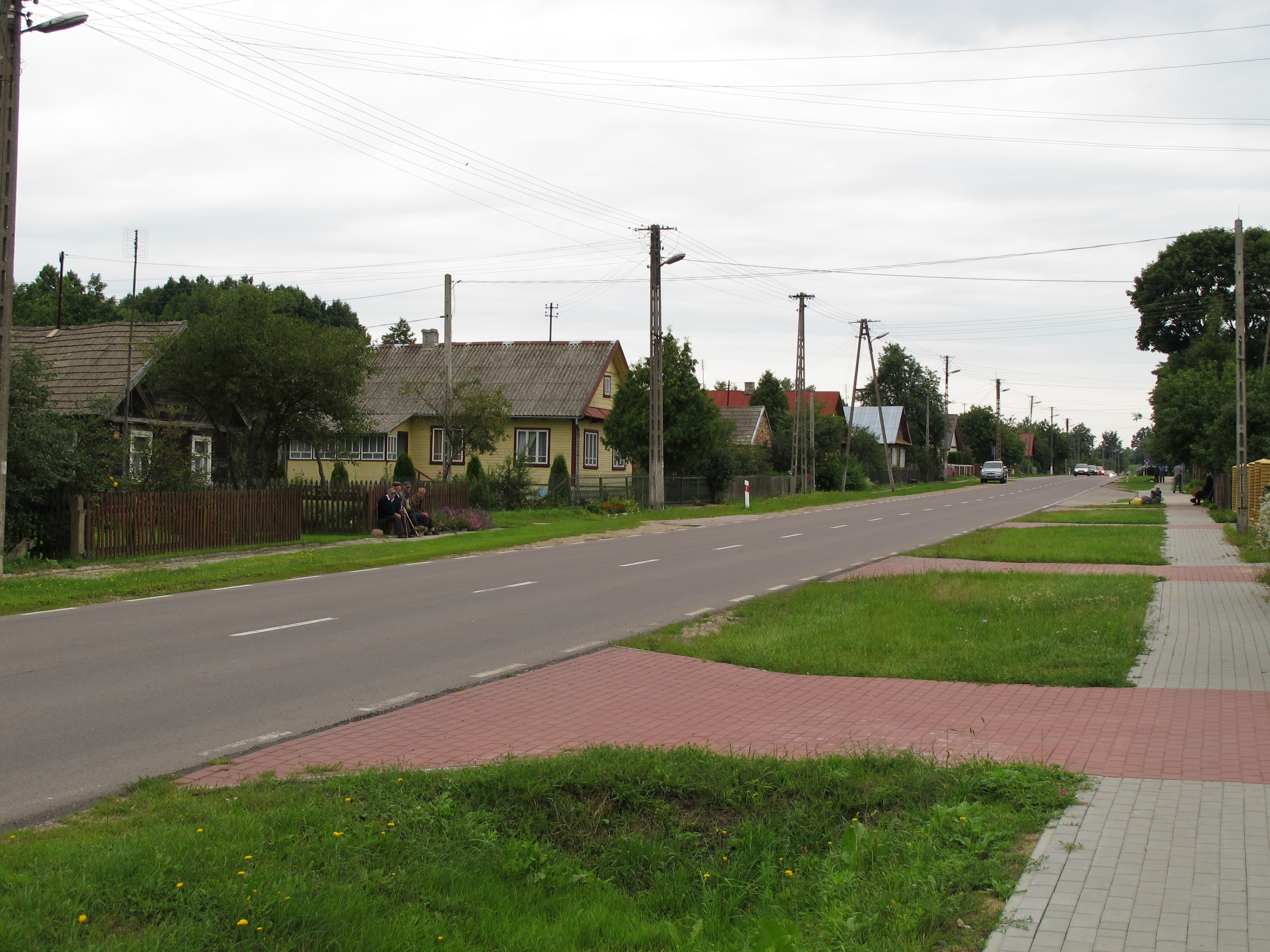

- Location within Poland
- Coordinates: 52°56′N 23°16′E
- Country: Poland
- Voivodeship: Podlaskie
- County: Białystok
- Gmina: Zabłudów
- Postal code: 16-060
- Vehicle registration: BIA

Ryboły [rɨˈbɔwɨ] is a village in the administrative district of Gmina Zabłudów, within Białystok County, Podlaskie Voivodeship, in north-eastern Poland.

Four Polish citizens were murdered by Nazi Germany in the village during World War II.
