= Olszanka, Białystok County =

Olszanka
- Village
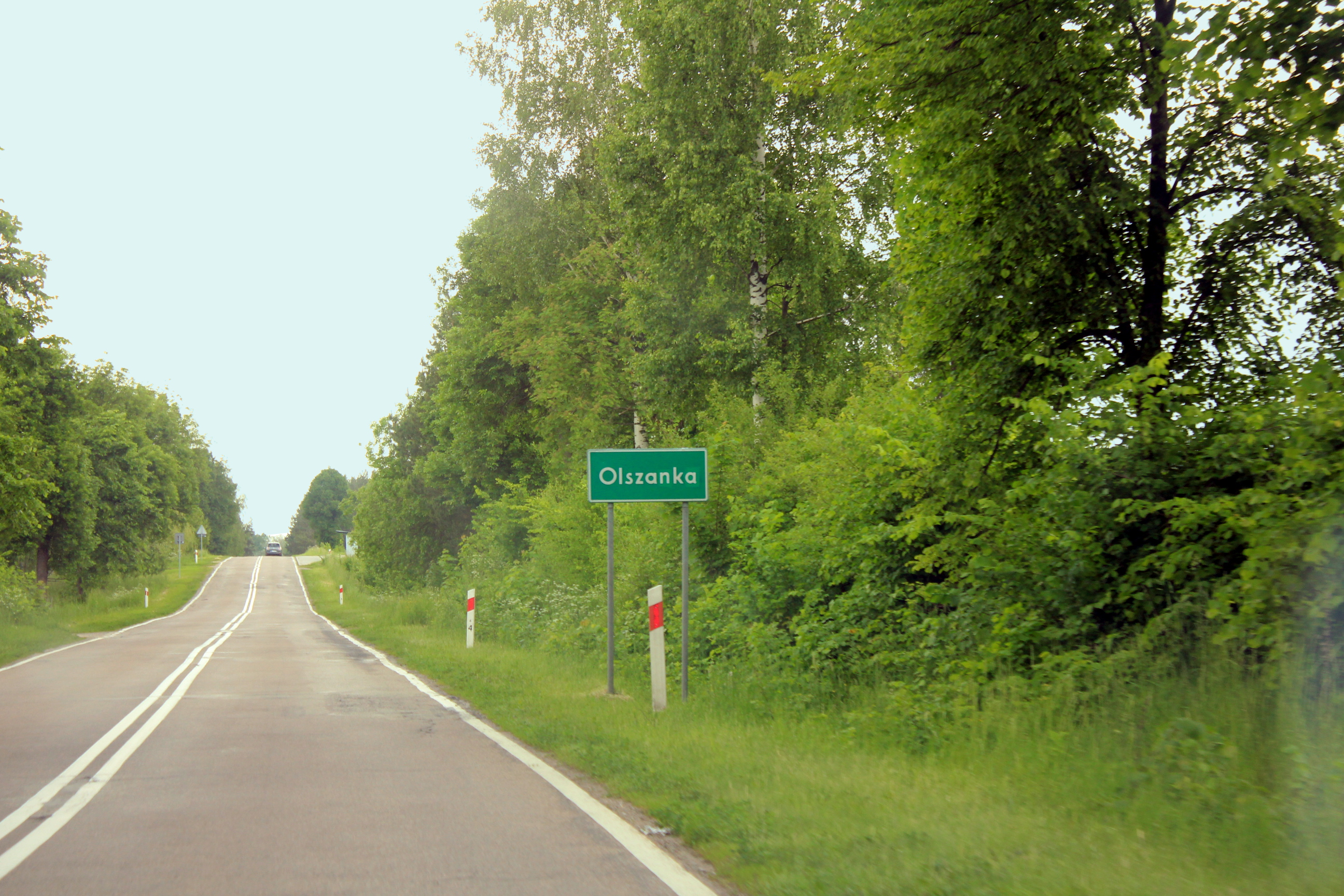

- Location within Poland
- Coordinates: 52°59′N 23°24′E
- Country: Poland
- Voivodeship: Podlaskie
- County: Białystok
- Gmina: Zabłudów

Olszanka [ɔlˈʂaŋka] is a village in the administrative district of Gmina Zabłudów, within Białystok County, Podlaskie Voivodeship, in north-eastern Poland.
