= Folwarki Tylwickie =

- Village
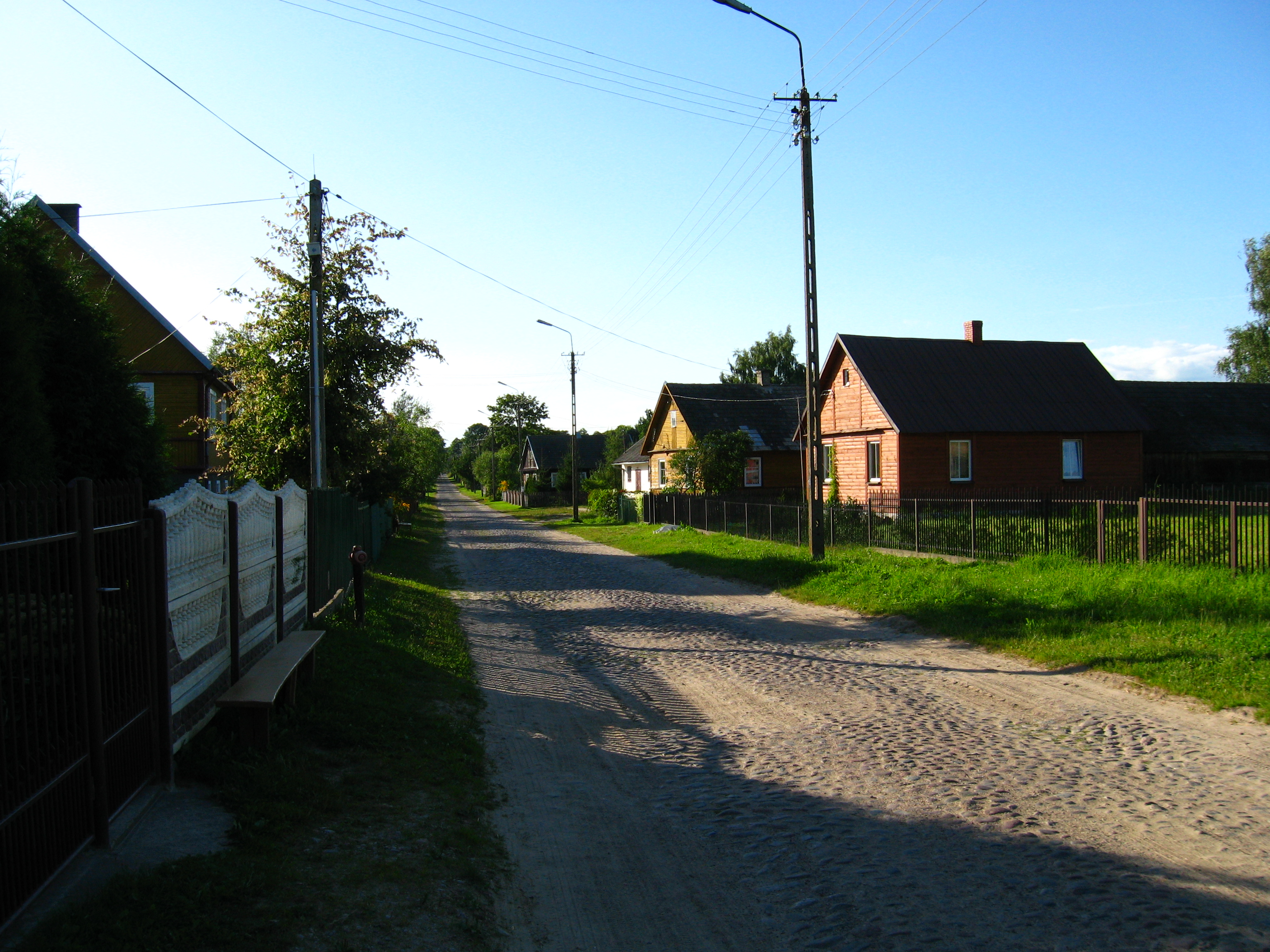
- Road in Folwarki Tylwickie

- Location within Poland
- Coordinates: 53°01′07″N 23°25′35″E
- Country: Poland
- Voivodeship: Podlaskie
- County: Białystok
- Gmina: Zabłudów

Folwarki Tylwickie [fɔlˈvarki tɨlˈvit͡skʲɛ] is a village in the administrative district of Gmina Zabłudów, within Białystok County, Podlaskie Voivodeship, in north-eastern Poland.
