= Żywkowo, Podlaskie Voivodeship =

Żywkowo
- Village
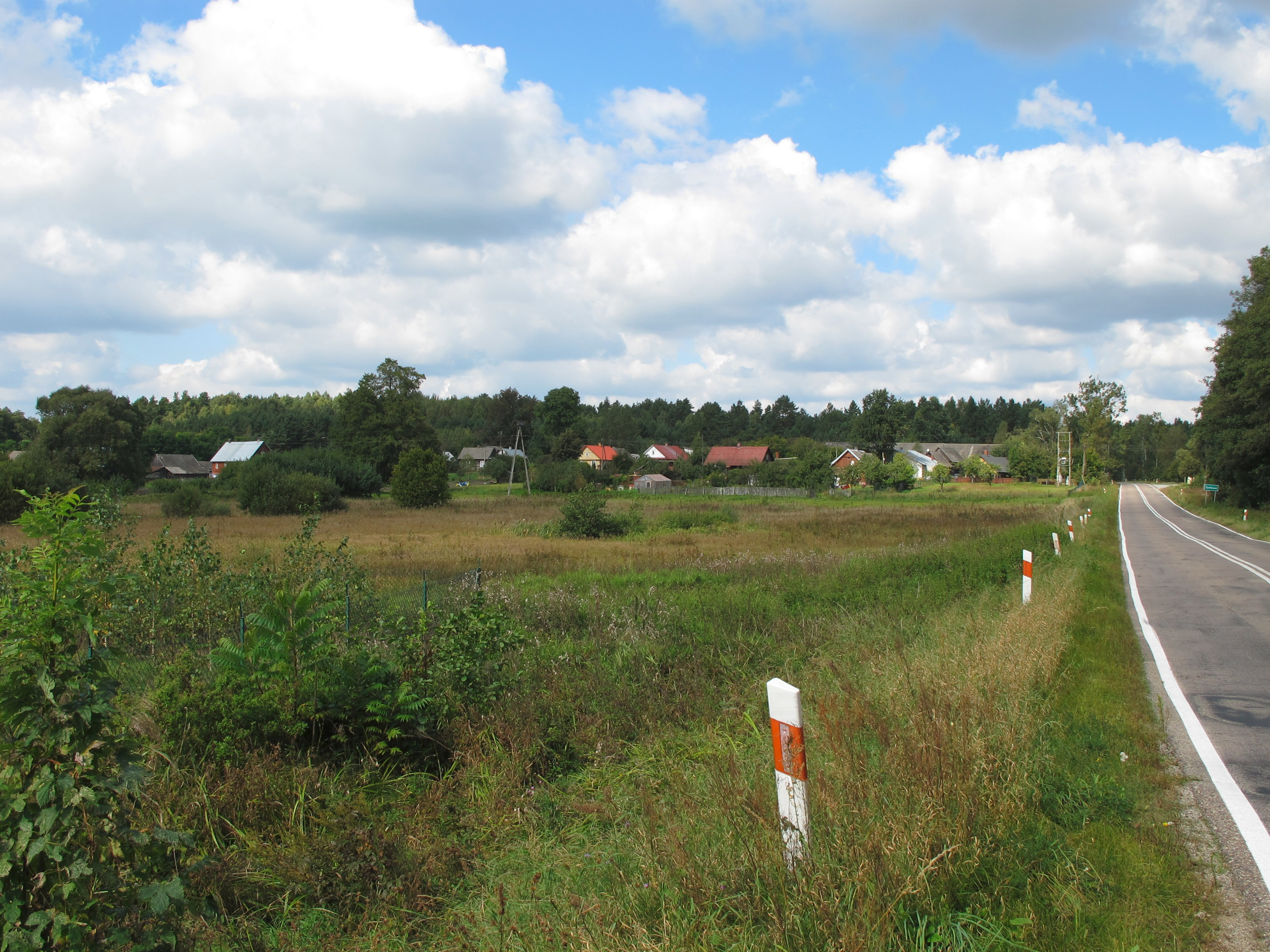

- Location within Poland
- Coordinates: 52°58′N 23°25′E
- Country: Poland
- Voivodeship: Podlaskie
- County: Białystok
- Gmina: Zabłudów
- Time zone: UTC+1 (CET)
  - Summer (DST): UTC+2 (CEST)
- Postal code: 16-060

Żywkowo [ʐɨfˈkɔvɔ] is a village in the administrative district of Gmina Zabłudów, within Białystok County, Podlaskie Voivodeship, in north-eastern Poland.
