= Łukiany =

- Village
- Location within Poland
- Coordinates: 53°5′59″N 23°22′5″E
- Country: Poland
- Voivodeship: Podlaskie
- County: Białystok
- Gmina: Zabłudów
- Population: 40

Łukiany [wuˈkʲanɨ] is a village in the administrative district of Gmina Zabłudów, within Białystok County, Podlaskie Voivodeship, in north-eastern Poland.
