= Dojlidy-Kolonia =

- Village
- Country: Poland
- Voivodeship: Podlaskie
- County: Białystok
- Gmina: Zabłudów

Dojlidy-Kolonia [dɔi̯ˈlidɨ kɔˈlɔɲa] is a village in the administrative district of Gmina Zabłudów, within Białystok County, Podlaskie Voivodeship, in north-eastern Poland.
