= Rafałówka, Podlaskie Voivodeship =

Rafałówka
- Village
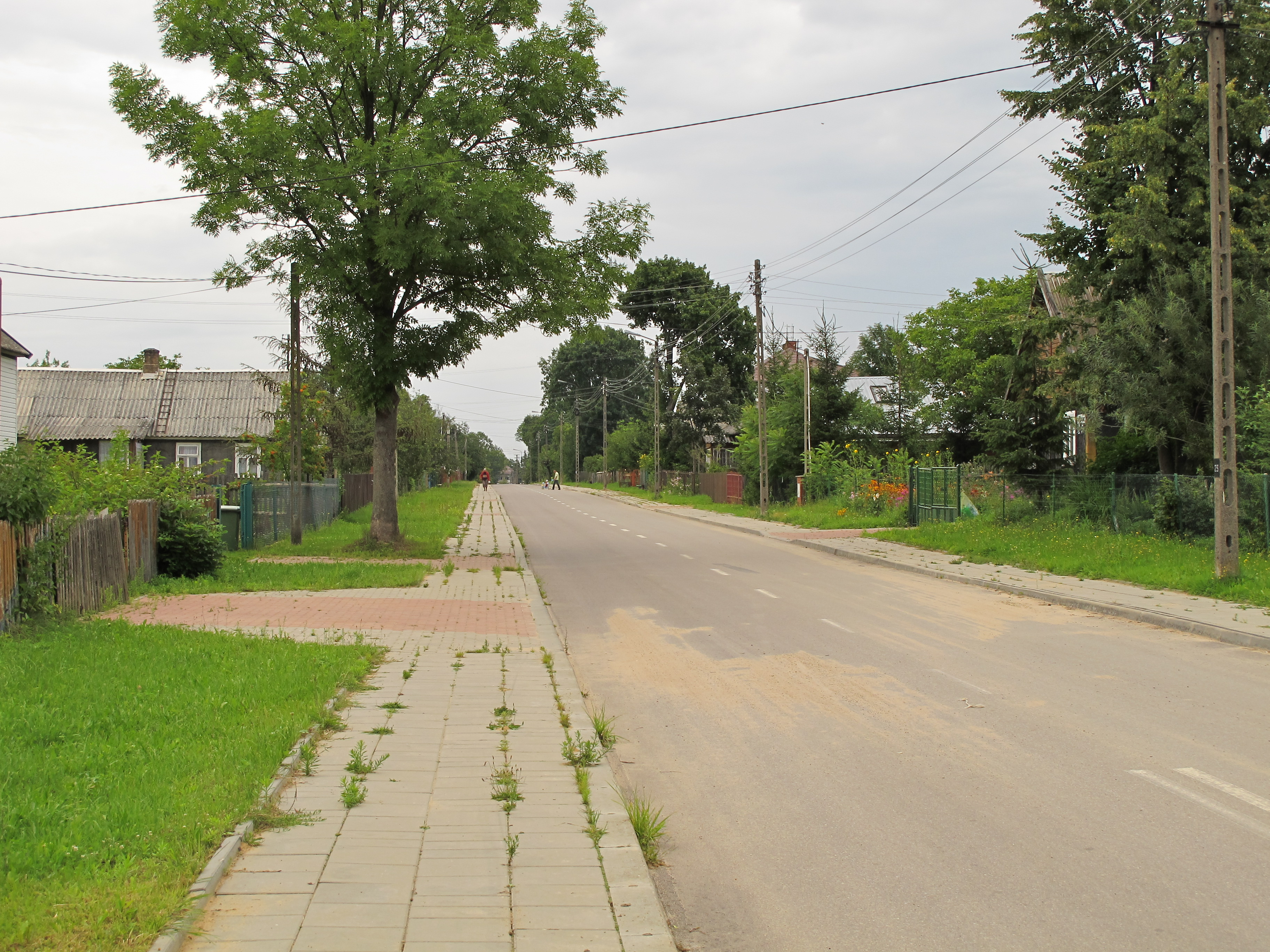

- Location within Poland
- Coordinates: 53°4′N 23°20′E
- Country: Poland
- Voivodeship: Podlaskie
- County: Białystok
- Gmina: Zabłudów
- Elevation: 166 m (545 ft)
- Population: 490

Rafałówka [rafaˈwufka] is a village in the administrative district of Gmina Zabłudów, within Białystok County, Podlaskie Voivodeship, in north-eastern Poland.
