= Kuriany, Poland =

Kuriany
- Village
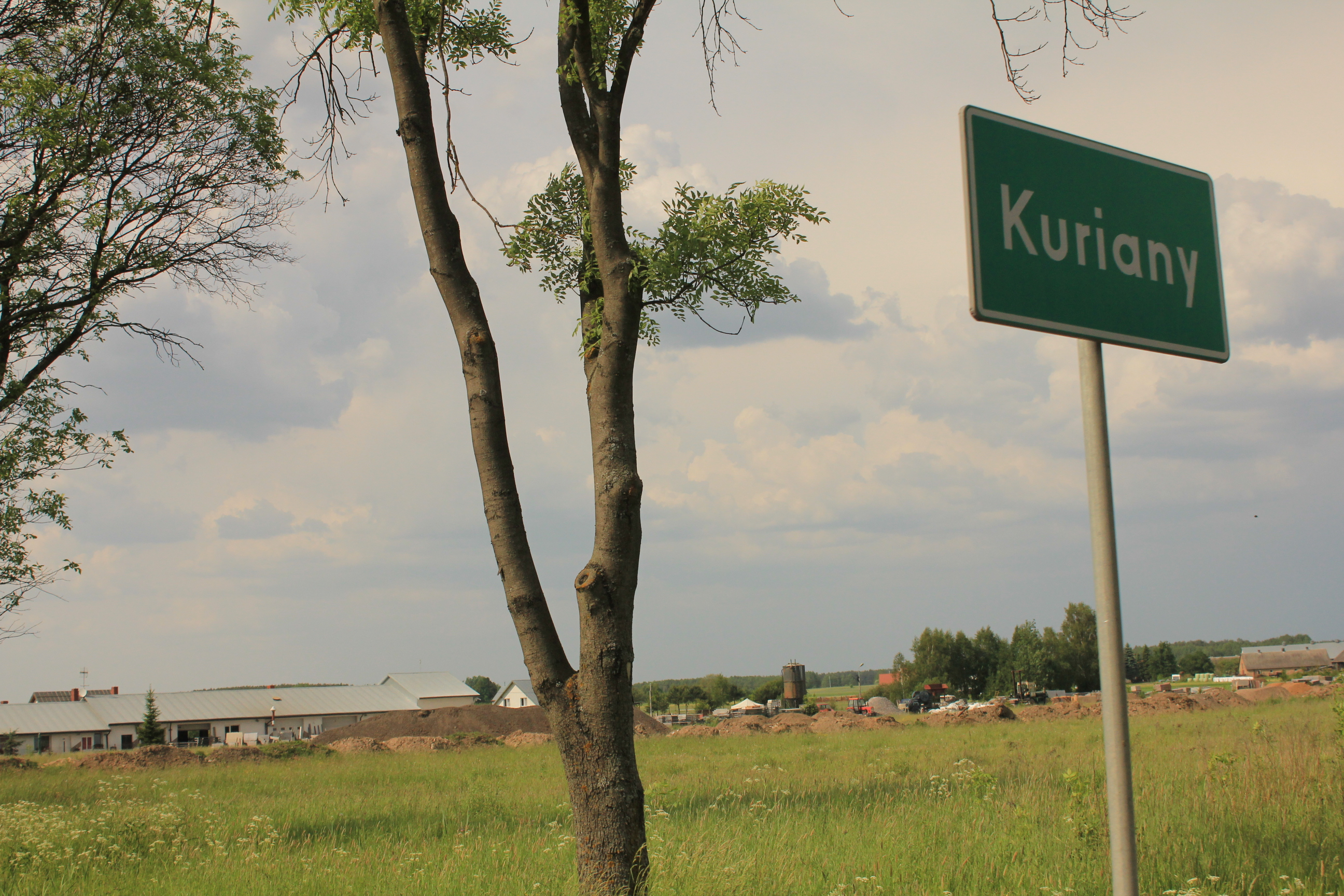

- Location within Poland
- Coordinates: 53°5′N 23°16′E
- Country: Poland
- Voivodeship: Podlaskie
- County: Białystok
- Gmina: Zabłudów
- Population: 600

Kuriany [kuˈrjanɨ] is a village in the administrative district of Gmina Zabłudów, within Białystok County, Podlaskie Voivodeship, in north-eastern Poland.
