= Ostrówki, Podlaskie Voivodeship =

Ostrówki
- Village
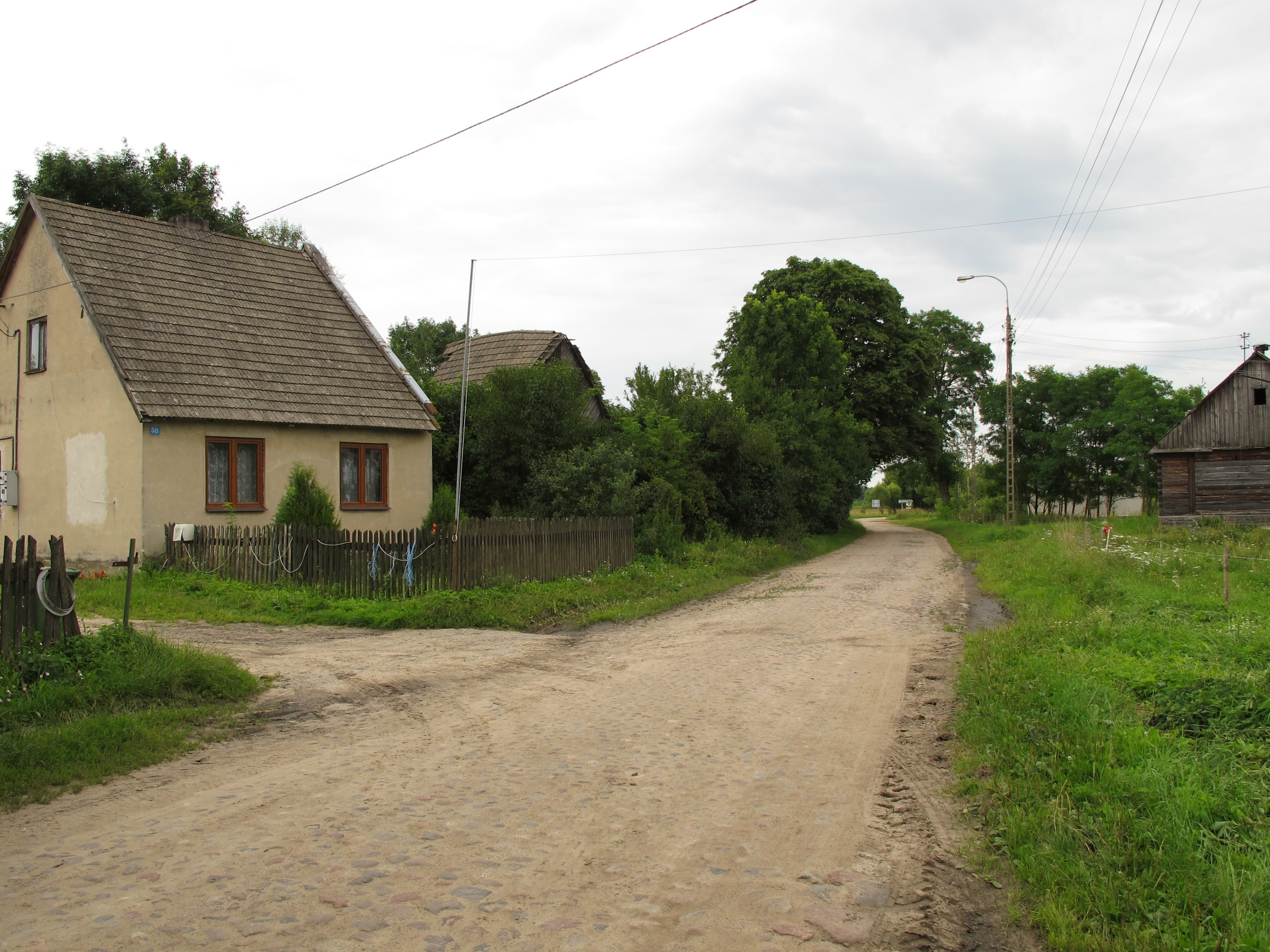

- Location within Poland
- Coordinates: 52°58′N 23°20′E
- Country: Poland
- Voivodeship: Podlaskie
- County: Białystok
- Gmina: Zabłudów

Ostrówki [ɔsˈtrufki] is a village in the administrative district of Gmina Zabłudów, within Białystok County, Podlaskie Voivodeship, in north-eastern Poland.

== Gallery ==
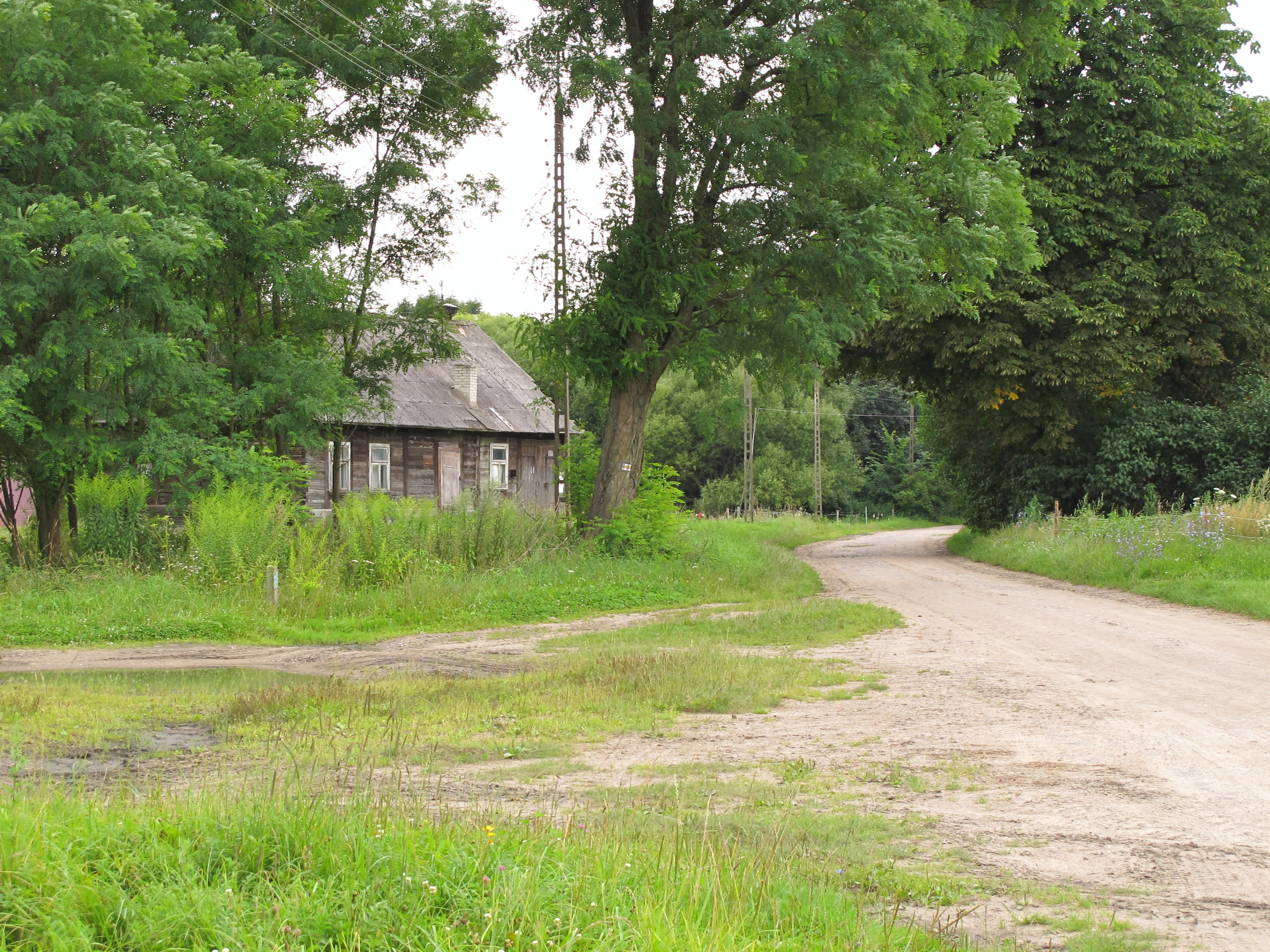
