= Solniki, Białystok County =

Solniki
- Village
- Location within Poland
- Coordinates: 52°59′17″N 23°17′17″E
- Country: Poland
- Voivodeship: Podlaskie
- County: Białystok
- Gmina: Zabłudów

Solniki [sɔlˈniki] is a village in the administrative district of Gmina Zabłudów, within Białystok County, Podlaskie Voivodeship, in north-eastern Poland.
