= Panki =

Panki is a name of the following localities:

== India ==
- Panki, Jharkhand
  - Panki Assembly constituency
  - Panki block, containing the town of Panki
- Panki, Kanpur, Uttar Pradesh
  - Panki railway station
  - Panki Thermal Power Station
- Panki, Kendrapada, Odisha

== Poland ==
- Pańki, Gmina Choroszcz
- Pańki, Gmina Juchnowiec Kościelny
- Panki, Silesian Voivodeship
- Gmina Panki, Kłobuck County, Silesian Voivodeship

== Russia ==
- Panki, a settlement and railway station (now in the Lyubertsy city)
