= Kozany =

Kozany may refer to:

- Kożany, Poland
- Kožany, Slovakia
