= Baranki (disambiguation) =

Baranki is a village in Poland.

Baraanki may also refer to:

- Baranki, Breast Oblast, a village in Belarus
- Baranki, a Russian variant of bublik bread
