= Zaleskie =

Zaleskie may refer to the following places:

- Zaleskie, Białystok County in Podlaskie Voivodeship (north-east Poland)
- Zaleskie, Sejny County in Podlaskie Voivodeship (north-east Poland)
- Zaleskie, Pomeranian Voivodeship (north Poland)
