= Gmina Juchnowiec Kościelny =

Gmina Juchnowiec Kościelny Juchnowiec Kościelny Commune
- Gmina
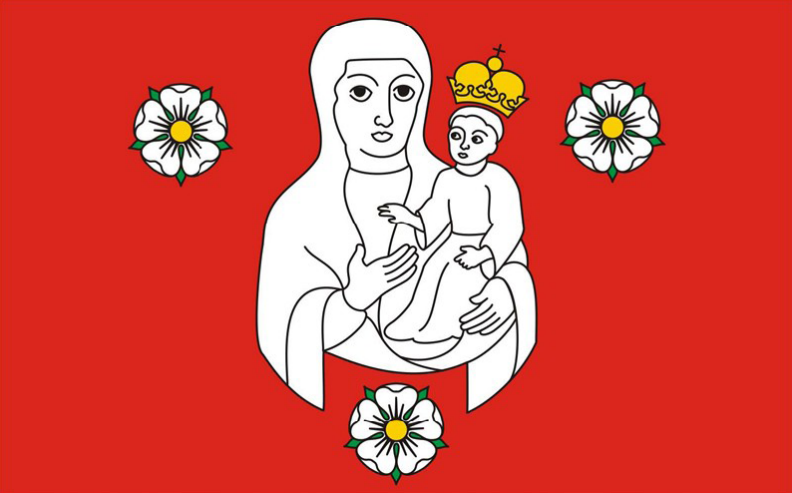
- Flag Coat of arms

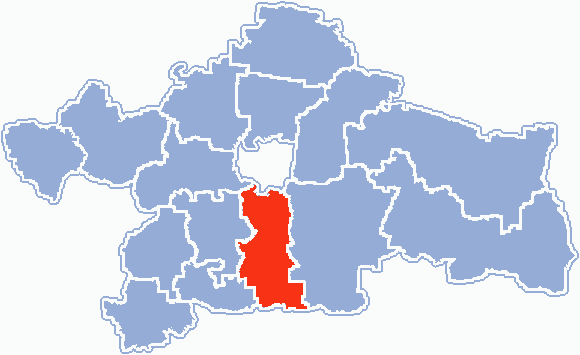
- Location within Białystok County
- Coordinates (Juchnowiec Kościelny): 53°1′12″N 23°8′22″E
- Country: Poland
- Voivodeship: Podlaskie
- County: Białystok County
- Seat: Juchnowiec Kościelny

Area
  - Total: 172.06 km^{2} (66.43 sq mi)

Population (2006)
  - Total: 13,421
  - Density: 78.002/km^{2} (202.02/sq mi)
- Website: http://www.juchnowiec.gmina.pl/

Gmina Juchnowiec Kościelny is a rural gmina (administrative district) in Białystok County, Podlaskie Voivodeship, in north-eastern Poland. Its seat is the village of Juchnowiec Kościelny, which lies approximately 11 kilometres (7 mi) south of the regional capital Białystok.

The gmina covers an area of 172.06 square kilometres (66.4 sq mi), and as of 2006 its total population is 13,421.

== Villages ==
Gmina Juchnowiec Kościelny contains the villages and settlements of Baranki, Biele, Bogdanki, Bronczany, Czerewki, Dorożki, Hermanówka, Hołówki Duże, Hołówki Małe, Horodniany, Hryniewicze, Ignatki, Ignatki-Kolonia, Izabelin, Janowicze, Janowicze-Kolonia, Juchnowiec Dolny, Juchnowiec Dolny-Kolonia, Juchnowiec Górny, Juchnowiec Kościelny, Kleosin, Klewinowo, Kojrany, Kolonia Koplany, Kolonia Księżyno, Koplany, Kożany, Kozowszczyzna, Księżyno, Lewickie, Lewickie-Kolonia, Lewickie-Stacja, Mańkowizna, Niewodnica Nargilewska, Niewodnica Nargilewska-Kolonia, Ogrodniczki, Olmonty, Pańki, Rostołty, Rumejki, Simuny, Solniczki, Śródlesie, Stanisławowo, Szerenosy, Tryczówka, Wojszki, Wólka, Zajączki, Zaleskie and Złotniki.

== Neighbouring gminas ==
Gmina Juchnowiec Kościelny is bordered by the city of Białystok and by the gminas of Bielsk Podlaski, Choroszcz, Suraż, Turośń Kościelna, Wyszki and Zabłudów.
