= Ogrodniczki =

Ogrodniczki may refer to the following places in Poland:

- Ogrodniczki, Gmina Juchnowiec Kościelny
- Ogrodniczki, Gmina Supraśl
