= Kojrany =

- Settlement
- Location within Poland
- Coordinates: 52°58′08″N 23°11′53″E
- Country: Poland
- Voivodeship: Podlaskie
- County: Białystok
- Gmina: Juchnowiec Kościelny

Kojrany [kɔi̯ˈranɨ] is a settlement in the administrative district of Gmina Juchnowiec Kościelny, within Białystok County, Podlaskie Voivodeship, in north-eastern Poland.
