= Niewodnica Nargilewska-Kolonia =

- Village
- Location within Poland
- Coordinates: 53°03′59″N 23°12′55″E
- Country: Poland
- Voivodeship: Podlaskie
- County: Białystok
- Gmina: Juchnowiec Kościelny

Niewodnica Nargilewska-Kolonia [ɲɛvɔdˈnit͡sa narɡiˈlɛfska kɔˈlɔɲa] is a village in the administrative district of Gmina Juchnowiec Kościelny, within Białystok County, Podlaskie Voivodeship, in north-eastern Poland.
