= Stanisławowo, Białystok County =

Stanisławowo
- Village
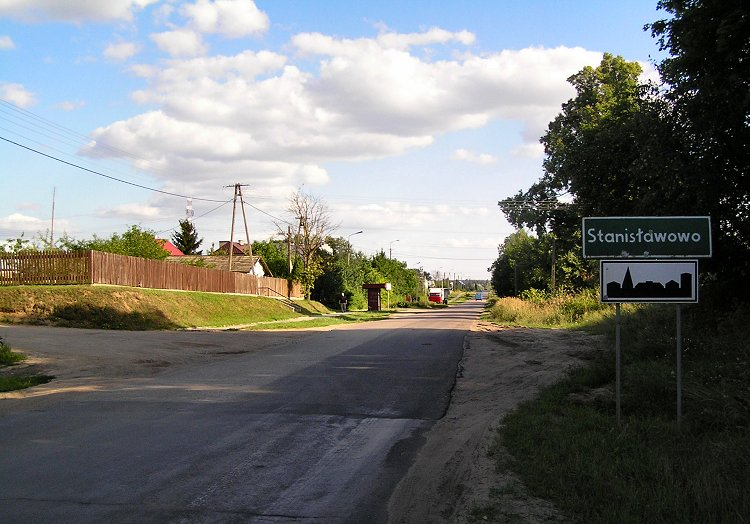

- Location within Poland
- Coordinates: 53°4′58″N 23°13′11″E
- Country: Poland
- Voivodeship: Podlaskie
- County: Białystok
- Gmina: Juchnowiec Kościelny
- Population: 140

Stanisławowo [staniswaˈvɔvɔ] is a village in the administrative district of Gmina Juchnowiec Kościelny, within Białystok County, Podlaskie Voivodeship, in north-eastern Poland.
