= Izabelin, Podlaskie Voivodeship =

Izabelin
- Settlement
- Location within Poland
- Coordinates: 53°05′30″N 23°09′30″E
- Country: Poland
- Voivodeship: Podlaskie
- County: Białystok
- Gmina: Juchnowiec Kościelny
- Time zone: UTC+1 (CET)
  - Summer (DST): UTC+2 (CEST)

Izabelin [izaˈbɛlin] is a settlement in the administrative district of Gmina Juchnowiec Kościelny, within Białystok County, Podlaskie Voivodeship, in north-eastern Poland.

== History ==
In the interwar period, Izabelin was administratively located in the Białystok County in the Białystok Voivodeship of Poland. According to the 1921 census, the village had a population of 21, entirely Polish by nationality.

Following the invasion of Poland in September 1939, Izabelin was first occupied by the Soviet Union until 1941, and then by Nazi Germany until 1944.
