= Złotniki, Podlaskie Voivodeship =

Złotniki
- Village
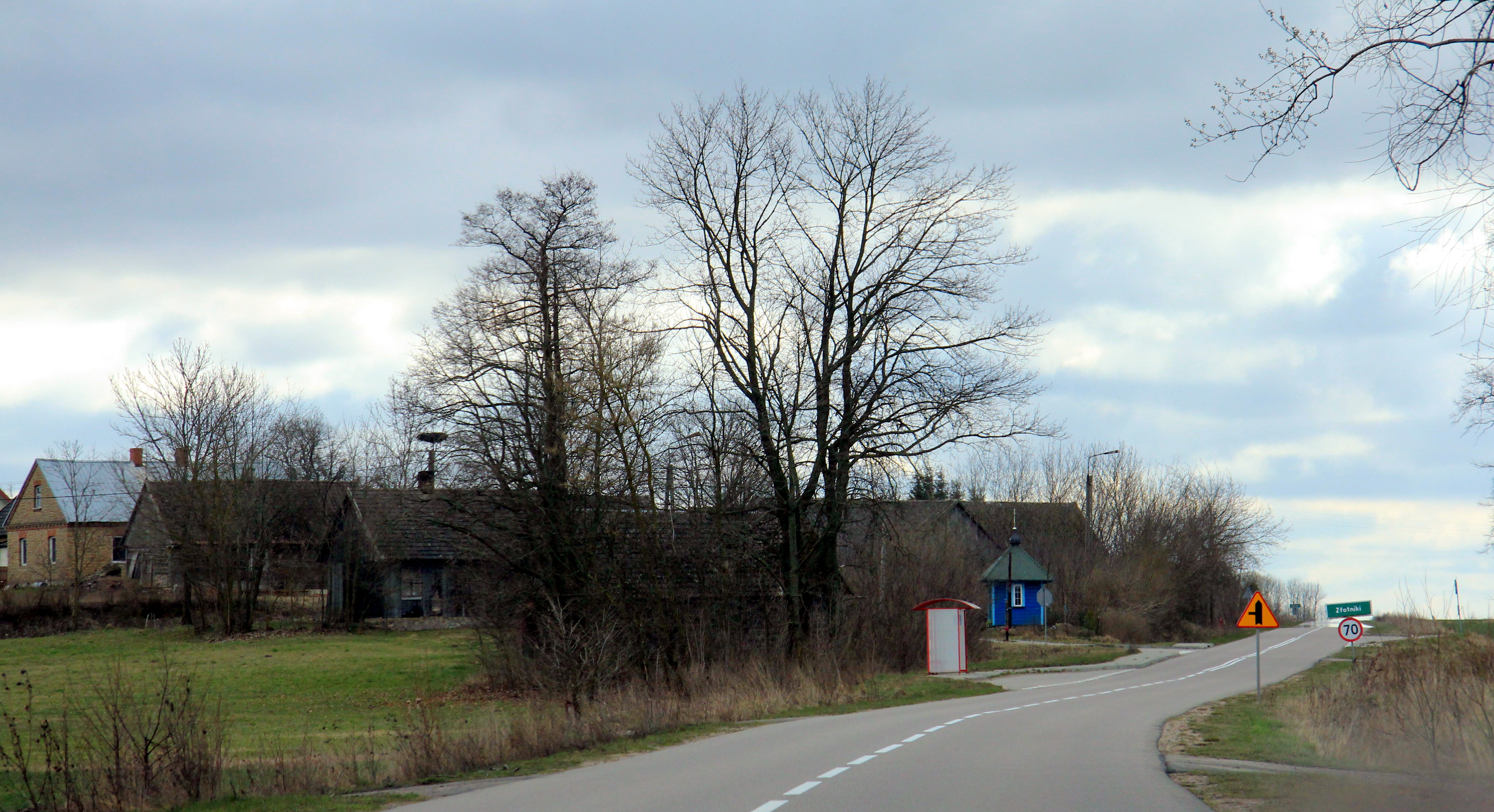

- Location within Poland
- Coordinates: 52°58′26″N 23°9′21″E
- Country: Poland
- Voivodeship: Podlaskie
- County: Białystok
- Gmina: Juchnowiec Kościelny

Złotniki [zwɔtˈniki] is a village in the administrative district of Gmina Juchnowiec Kościelny, within Białystok County, Podlaskie Voivodeship, in north-eastern Poland.
