= Niewodnica Nargilewska =

- Village
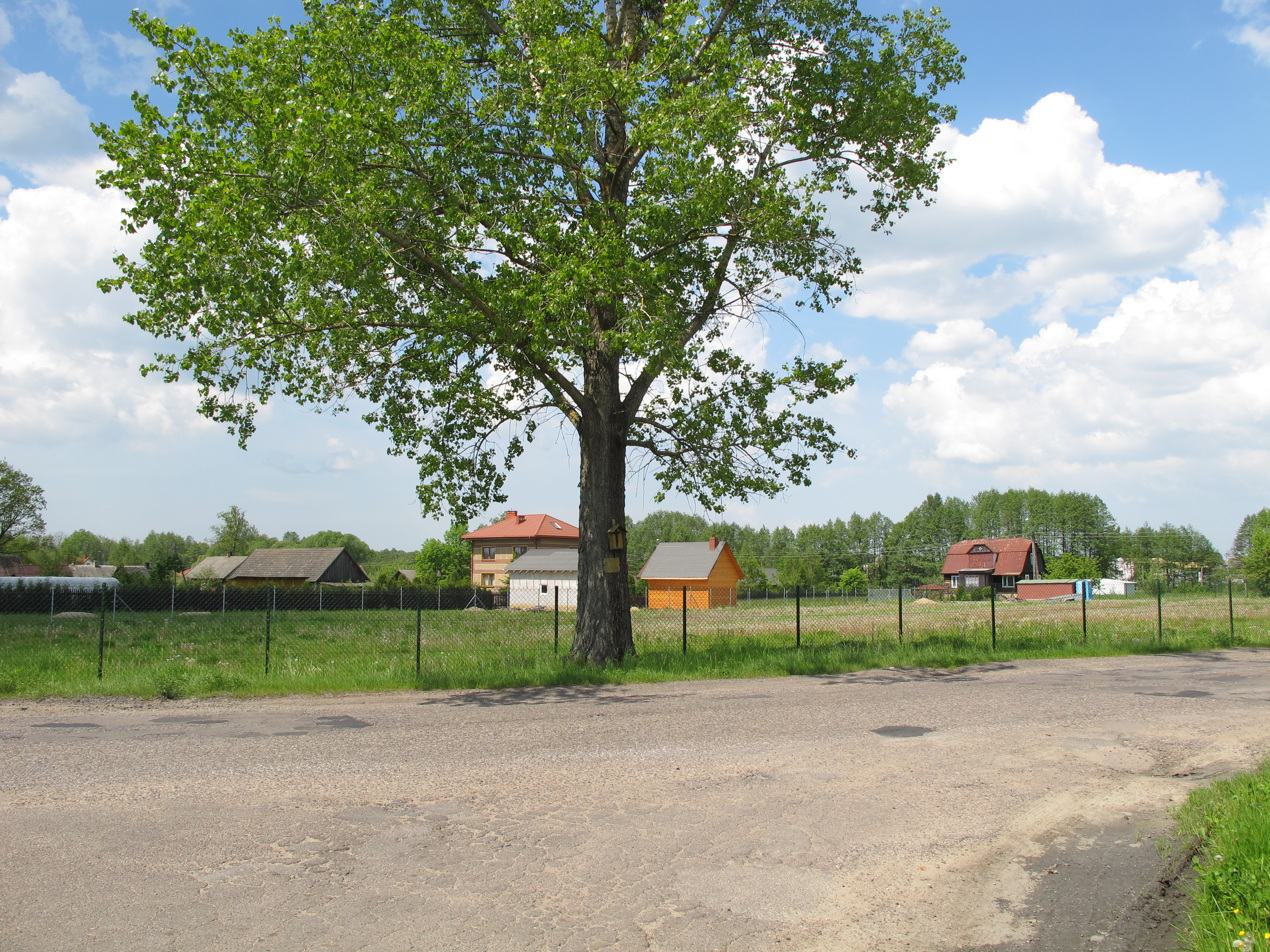

- Location within Poland
- Coordinates: 53°4′N 23°13′E
- Country: Poland
- Voivodeship: Podlaskie
- County: Białystok
- Gmina: Juchnowiec Kościelny

Niewodnica Nargilewska [ɲɛvɔdˈnit͡sa narɡiˈlɛfska] is a village in the administrative district of Gmina Juchnowiec Kościelny, within Białystok County, Podlaskie Voivodeship, in north-eastern Poland.
