= Wólka, Białystok County =

Wólka
- Village
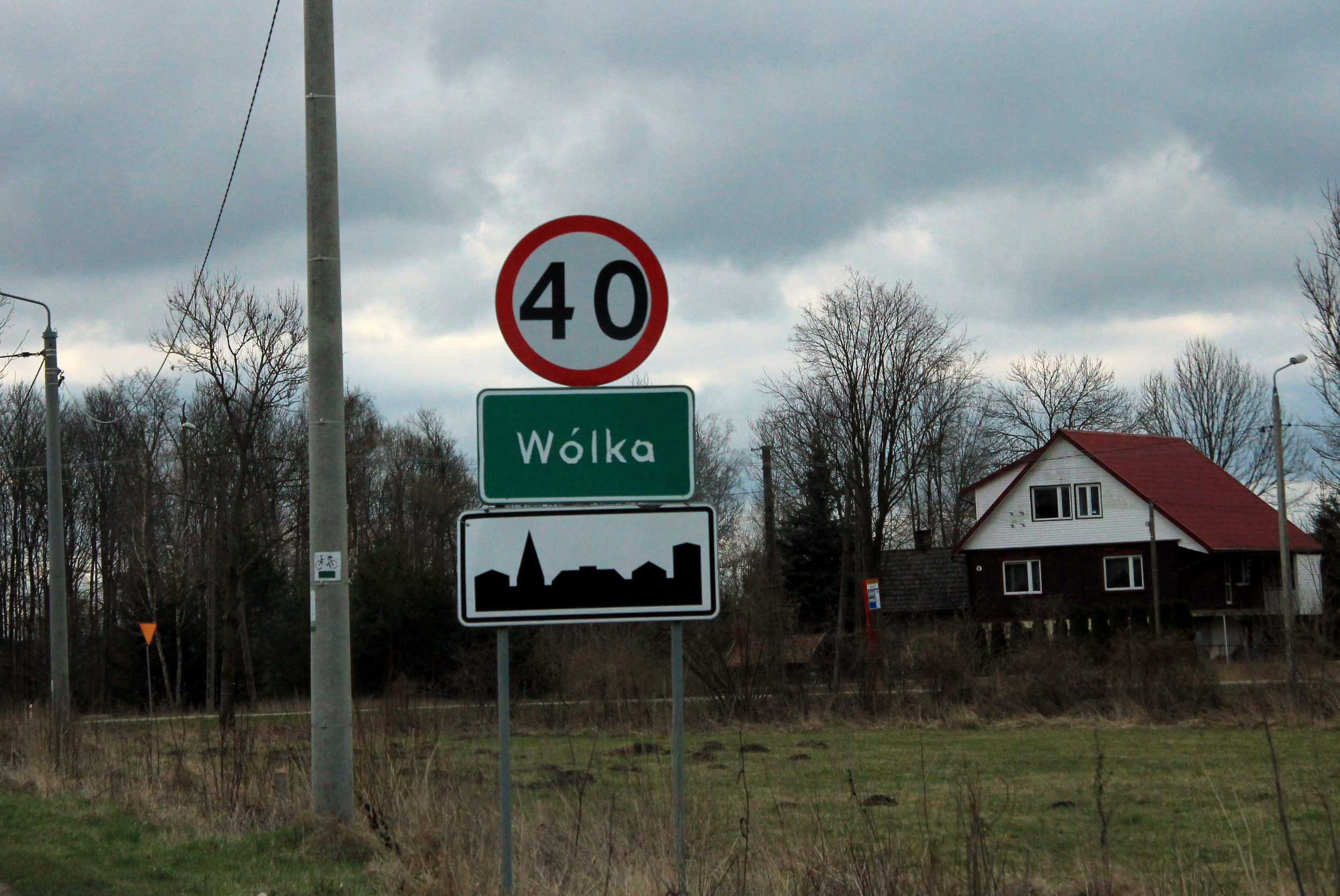

- Location within Poland
- Coordinates: 53°0′2″N 23°9′7″E
- Country: Poland
- Voivodeship: Podlaskie
- County: Białystok
- Gmina: Juchnowiec Kościelny

Wólka [ˈvulka] is a village in the administrative district of Gmina Juchnowiec Kościelny, within Białystok County, Podlaskie Voivodeship, in north-eastern Poland.
