= Juchnowiec Dolny-Kolonia =

- Settlement
- Location within Poland
- Coordinates: 53°00′53″N 23°07′09″E
- Country: Poland
- Voivodeship: Podlaskie
- County: Białystok
- Gmina: Juchnowiec Kościelny

Juchnowiec Dolny-Kolonia [juxˈnɔvjɛt͡s ˈdɔlnɨ kɔˈlɔɲa] is a settlement in the administrative district of Gmina Juchnowiec Kościelny, within Białystok County, Podlaskie Voivodeship, in north-eastern Poland.
