= Juchnowiec Kościelny =

- Village
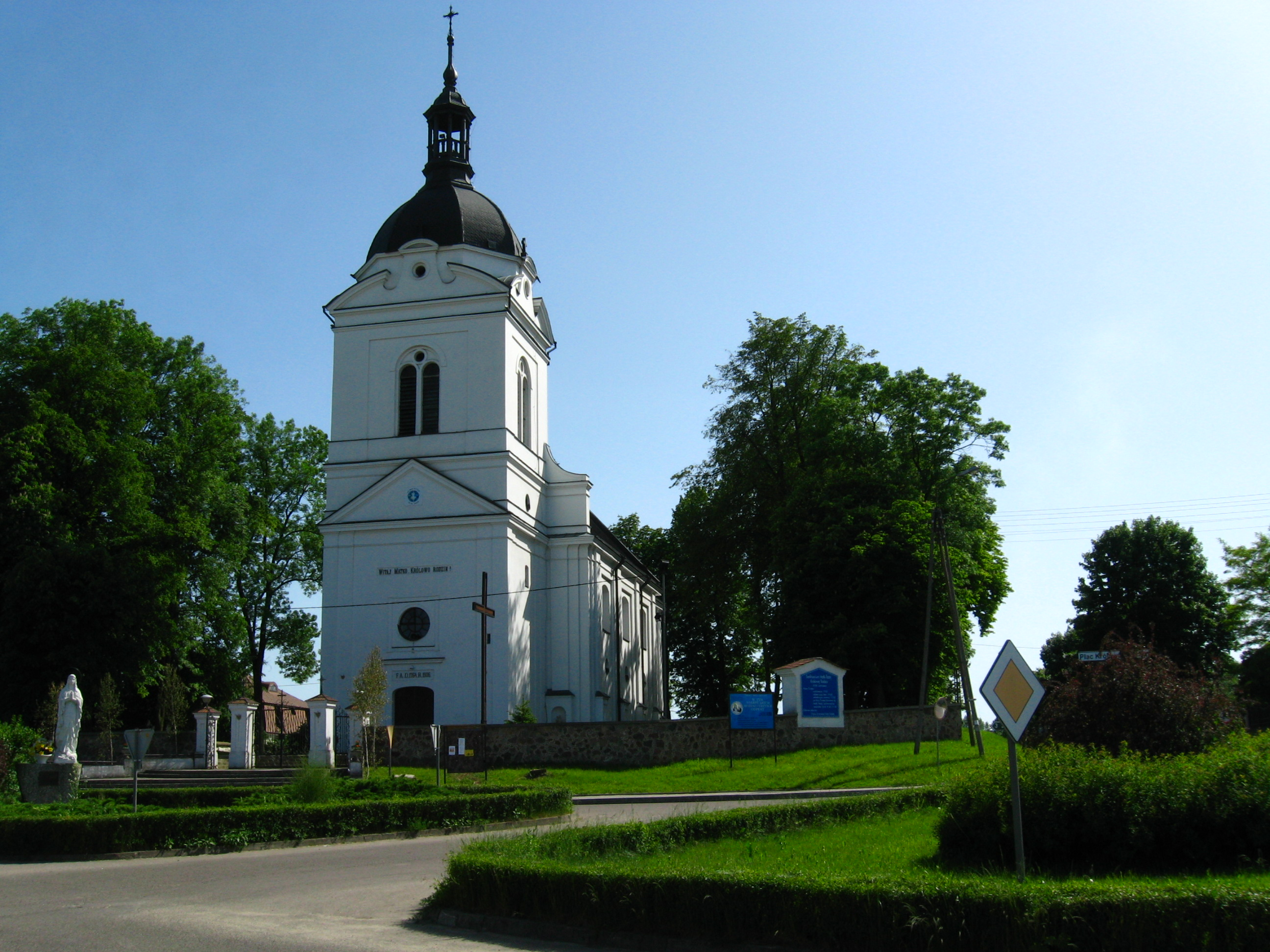
- Church of the Holy Trinity

- Location within Poland
- Coordinates: 53°1′12″N 23°8′22″E
- Country: Poland
- Voivodeship: Podlaskie
- County: Białystok
- Gmina: Juchnowiec Kościelny

Population
  - Total: 160

Juchnowiec Kościelny [juxˈnɔvjɛt͡s kɔɕˈt͡ɕɛlnɨ] is a village in Białystok County, Podlaskie Voivodeship, in north-eastern Poland. It is the seat of the gmina (administrative district) called Gmina Juchnowiec Kościelny.
