= Kleosin =

- Village
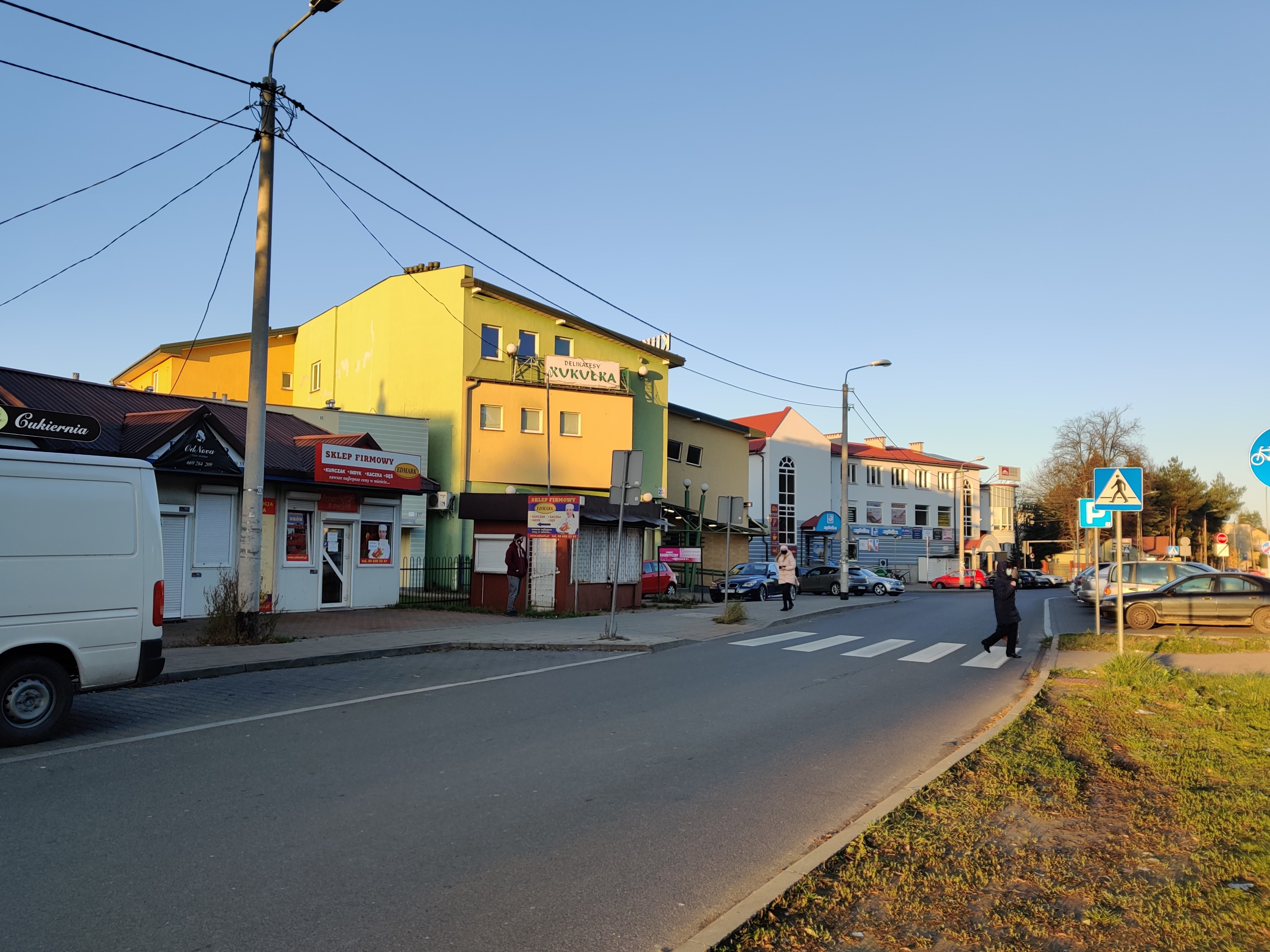

- Location within Poland
- Coordinates: 53°5′35″N 23°7′5″E
- Country: Poland
- Voivodeship: Podlaskie
- County: Białystok
- Gmina: Juchnowiec Kościelny
- Population: 5,700

Kleosin [klɛˈɔɕin] is a village in the administrative district of Gmina Juchnowiec Kościelny, within Białystok County, Podlaskie Voivodeship, in north-eastern Poland.
