= Kolonia Koplany =

- Village
- Location within Poland
- Coordinates: 52°58′38″N 23°11′33″E
- Country: Poland
- Voivodeship: Podlaskie
- County: Białystok
- Gmina: Juchnowiec Kościelny

Kolonia Koplany [kɔˈlɔɲa kɔˈplanɨ] is a village in the administrative district of Gmina Juchnowiec Kościelny, within Białystok County, Podlaskie Voivodeship, in north-eastern Poland.
