= Lewickie-Kolonia =

- Village
- Location within Poland
- Coordinates: 53°03′30″N 23°08′30″E
- Country: Poland
- Voivodeship: Podlaskie
- County: Białystok
- Gmina: Juchnowiec Kościelny

Lewickie-Kolonia [lɛˈvit͡skʲɛ kɔˈlɔɲa] is a village in the administrative district of Gmina Juchnowiec Kościelny, within Białystok County, Podlaskie Voivodeship, in north-eastern Poland.
