= Juchnowiec Górny =

- Village
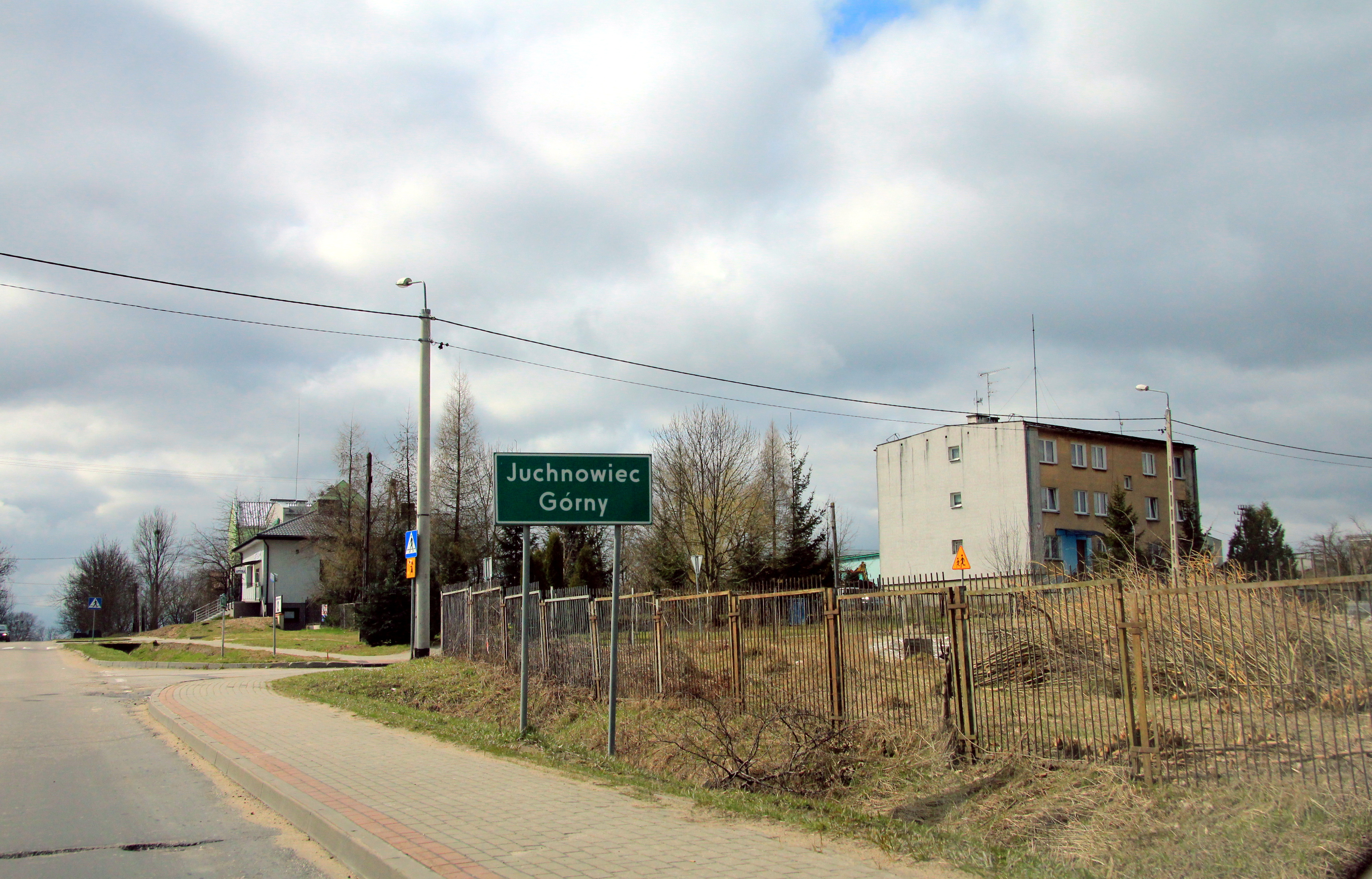

- Location within Poland
- Coordinates: 53°0′54.06″N 23°8′11.01″E
- Country: Poland
- Voivodeship: Podlaskie
- County: Białystok
- Gmina: Juchnowiec Kościelny

Juchnowiec Górny [juxˈnɔvjɛt͡s ˈɡurnɨ] is a village in the administrative district of Gmina Juchnowiec Kościelny, within Białystok County, Podlaskie Voivodeship, in north-eastern Poland.
