= Hołówki Małe =

- Village
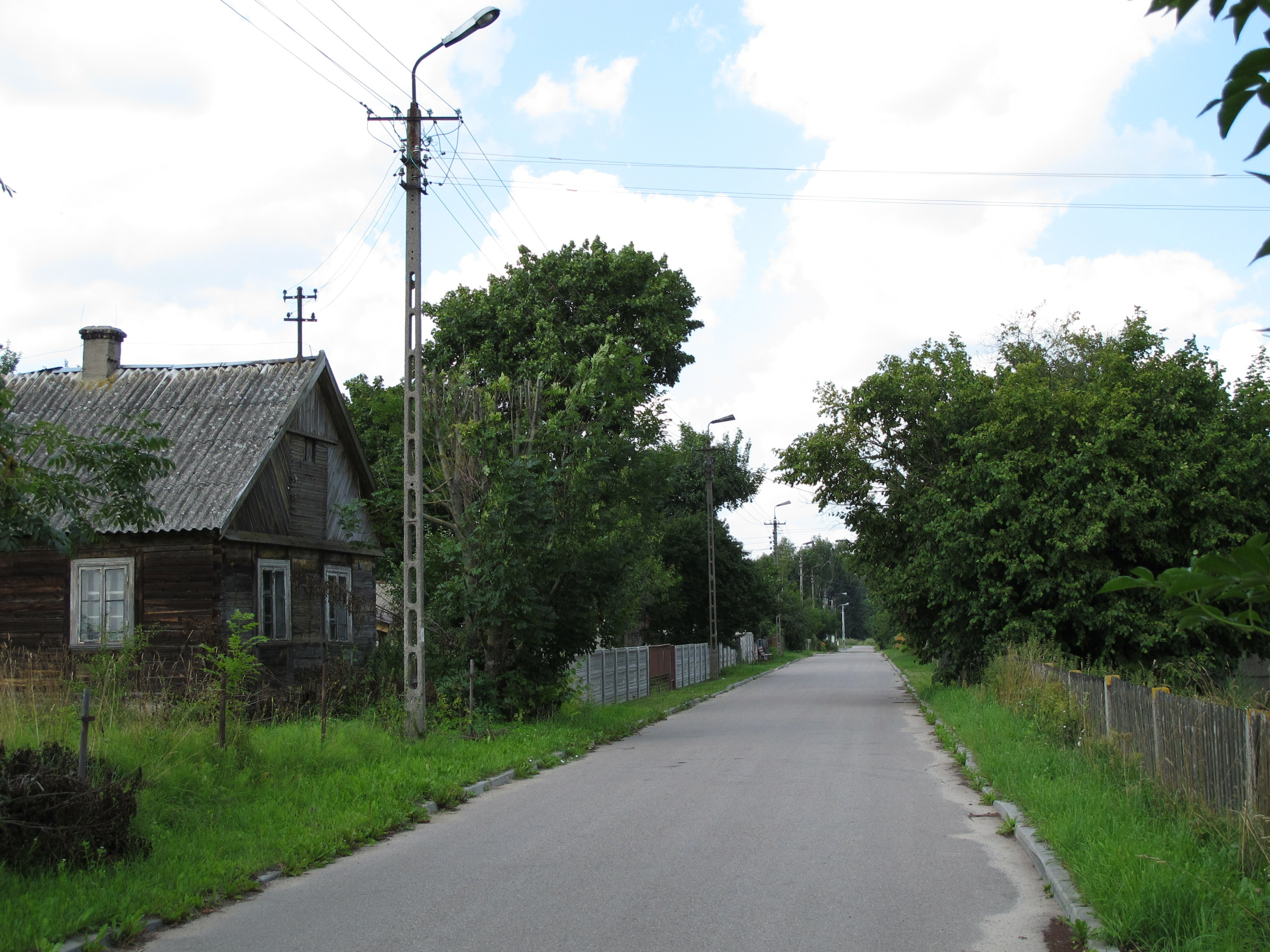
- Houses by the road in Hołówki Małe

- Location within Poland
- Coordinates: 52°59′31″N 23°5′57″E
- Country: Poland
- Voivodeship: Podlaskie
- County: Białystok
- Gmina: Juchnowiec Kościelny
- Highest elevation: 140 m (460 ft)
- Lowest elevation: 134 m (440 ft)
- Population (2011): >97
- Postal code: 16-061
- Vehicle registration: BIA

Hołówki Małe [xɔˈwufki ˈmawɛ] is a village in the administrative district of Gmina Juchnowiec Kościelny, within Białystok County, Podlaskie Voivodeship, in north-eastern Poland.
