= Tryczówka =

- Village
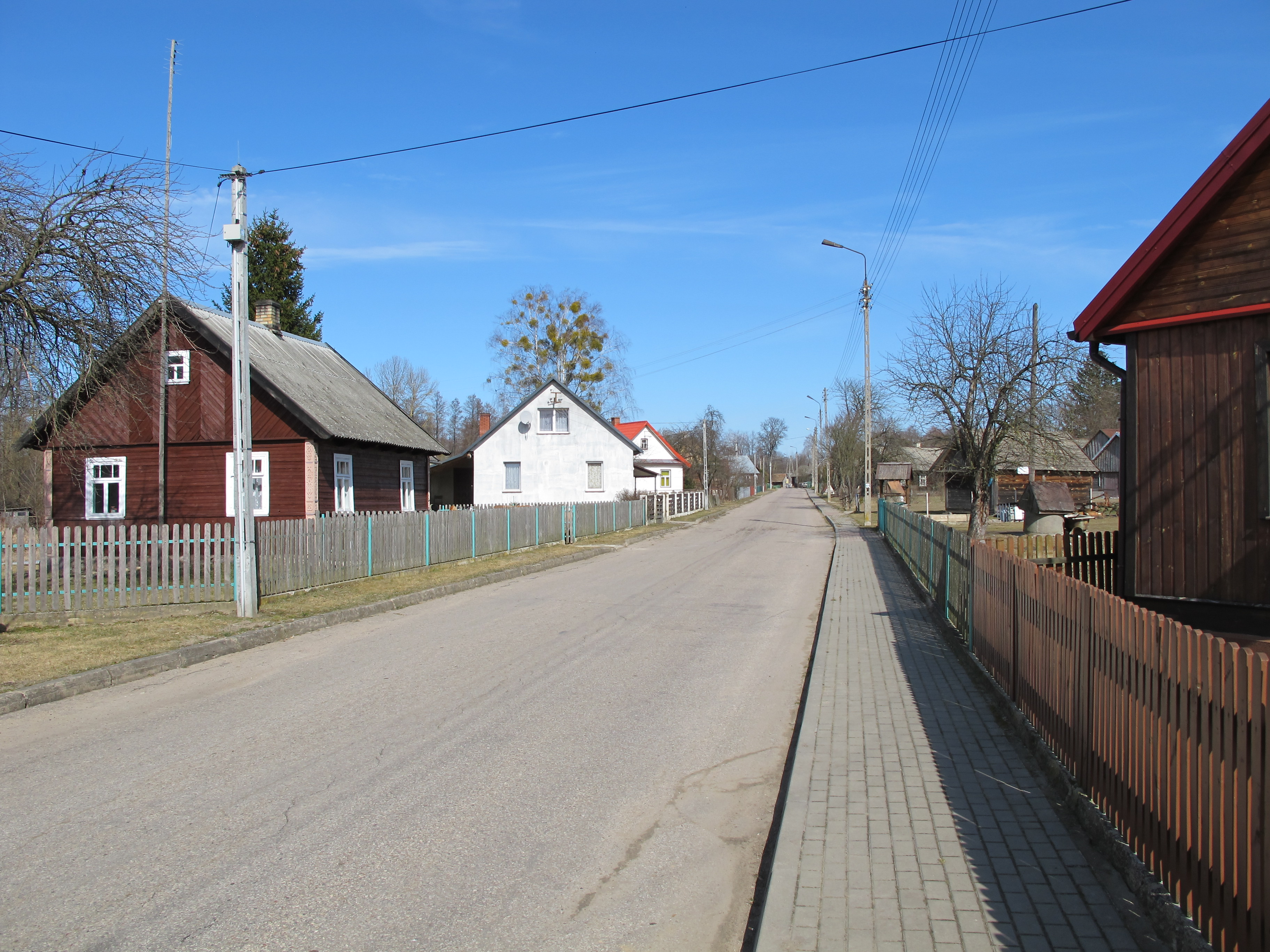

- Location within Poland
- Coordinates: 52°57′N 23°11′E
- Country: Poland
- Voivodeship: Podlaskie
- County: Białystok
- Gmina: Juchnowiec Kościelny

Tryczówka [trɨˈt͡ʂufka] is a village in the administrative district of Gmina Juchnowiec Kościelny, within Białystok County, Podlaskie Voivodeship, in north-eastern Poland.
