= Janowicze-Kolonia =

- Village
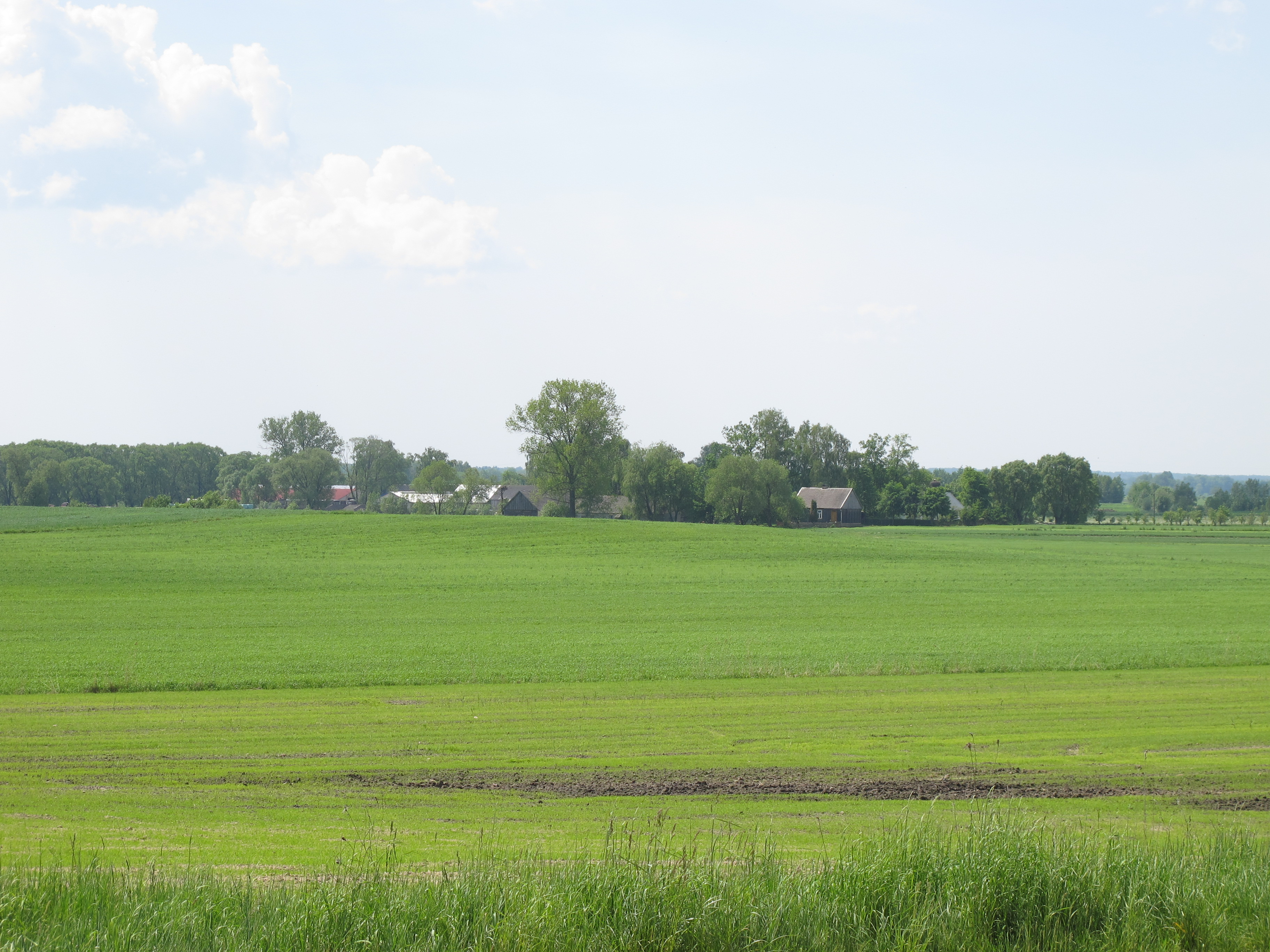
- Panoramic view of Janowicze-Kolonia

- Location within Poland
- Coordinates: 53°0′34.45″N 23°12′13.72″E
- Country: Poland
- Voivodeship: Podlaskie
- County: Białystok
- Gmina: Juchnowiec Kościelny

Janowicze-Kolonia [janɔˈvit͡ʂɛ kɔˈlɔɲa] is a village in the administrative district of Gmina Juchnowiec Kościelny, within Białystok County, Podlaskie Voivodeship, in north-eastern Poland.
