= Ignatki, Białystok County =

Ignatki
- Village
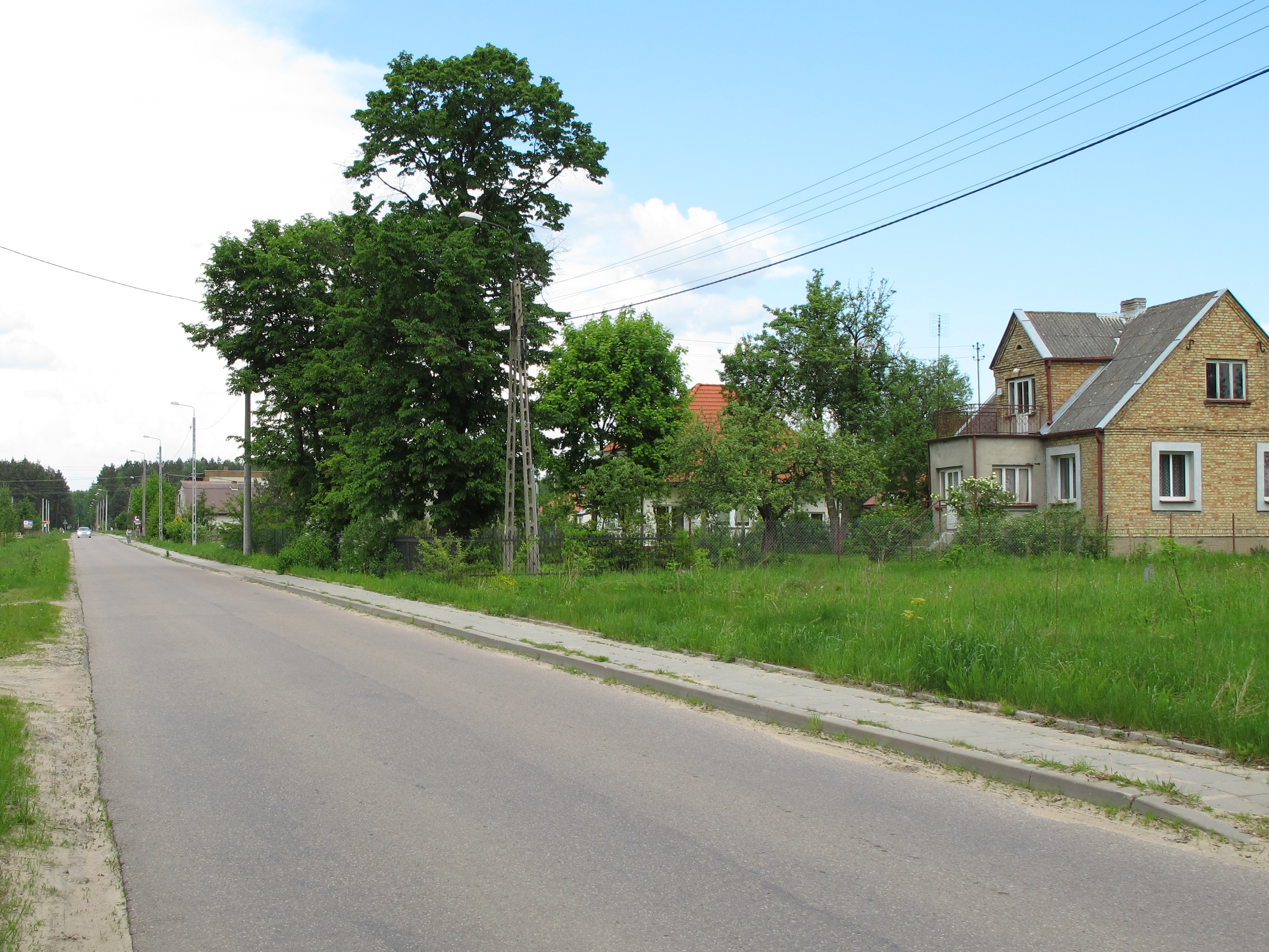

- Location within Poland
- Coordinates: 53°4′6.06″N 23°5′57.99″E
- Country: Poland
- Voivodeship: Podlaskie
- County: Białystok
- Gmina: Juchnowiec Kościelny
- Elevation: 132 m (433 ft)
- Post Code: 16-005
- Number Zone: (+48) 85
- Vehicle registration: BIA

Ignatki [iɡˈnatki] is a village in the administrative district of Gmina Juchnowiec Kościelny, within Białystok County, Podlaskie Voivodeship, in north-eastern Poland.
