= Kolonia Księżyno =

- Village
- Location within Poland
- Coordinates: 53°4′50″N 23°6′45″E
- Country: Poland
- Voivodeship: Podlaskie
- County: Białystok
- Gmina: Juchnowiec Kościelny

Kolonia Księżyno [kɔˈlɔɲa kɕɛ̃ˈʐɨnɔ] is a village in the administrative district of Gmina Juchnowiec Kościelny, within Białystok County, Podlaskie Voivodeship, in north-eastern Poland.
