= Ignatki-Kolonia =

- Village
- Location within Poland
- Coordinates: 53°4′4″N 23°6′0″E
- Country: Poland
- Voivodeship: Podlaskie
- County: Białystok
- Gmina: Juchnowiec Kościelny
- Population: 210

Ignatki-Kolonia [iɡˈnatki kɔˈlɔɲa] is a village in the administrative district of Gmina Juchnowiec Kościelny, within Białystok County, Podlaskie Voivodeship, in north-eastern Poland.
