= Szerenosy =

- Village
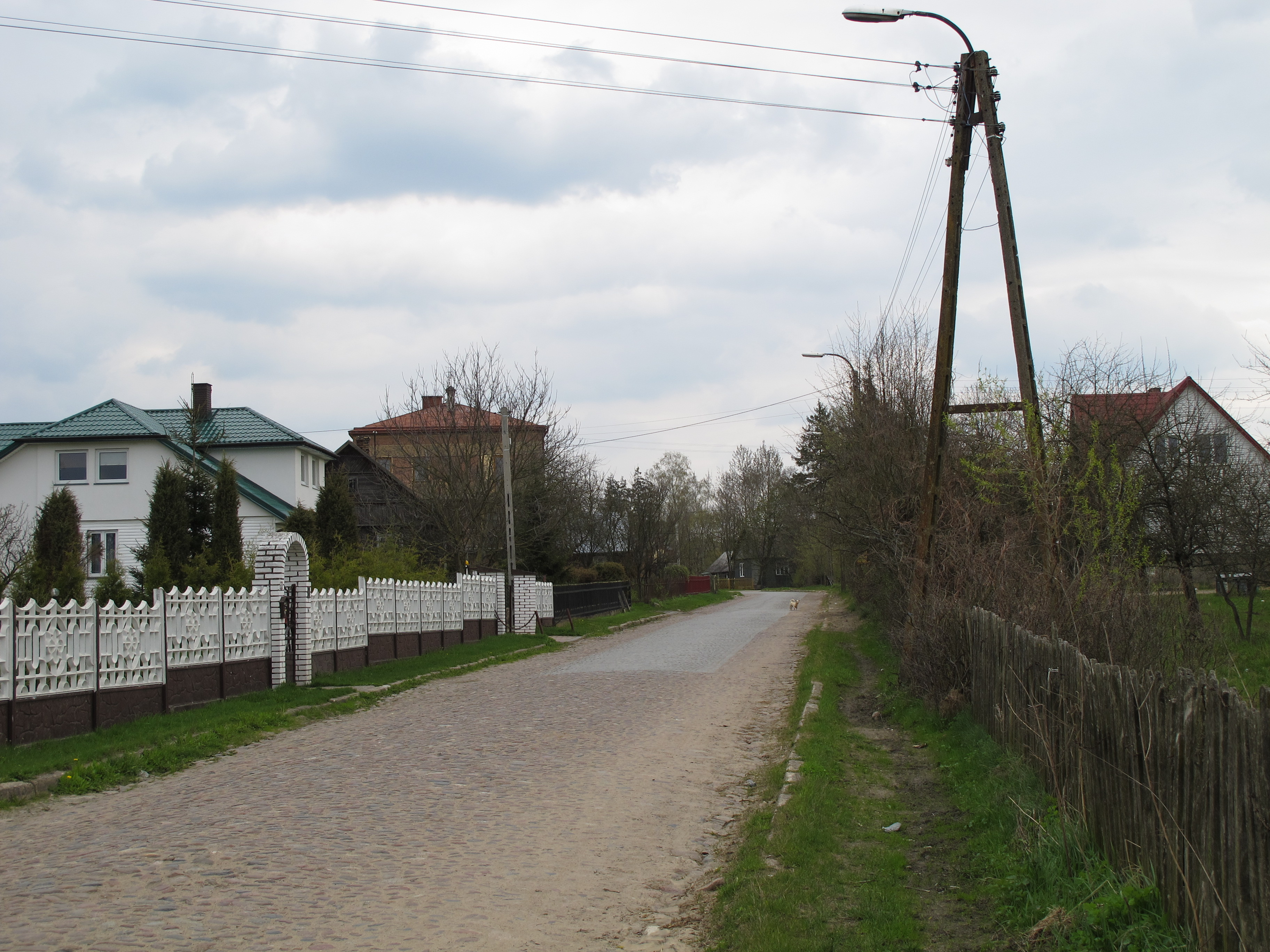

- Location within Poland
- Coordinates: 53°1′N 23°6′E
- Country: Poland
- Voivodeship: Podlaskie
- County: Białystok
- Gmina: Juchnowiec Kościelny

Szerenosy [ʂɛrɛˈnɔsɨ] is a village in the administrative district of Gmina Juchnowiec Kościelny, within Białystok County, Podlaskie Voivodeship, in north-eastern Poland.
