= Wojszki, Białystok County =

Wojszki
- Village
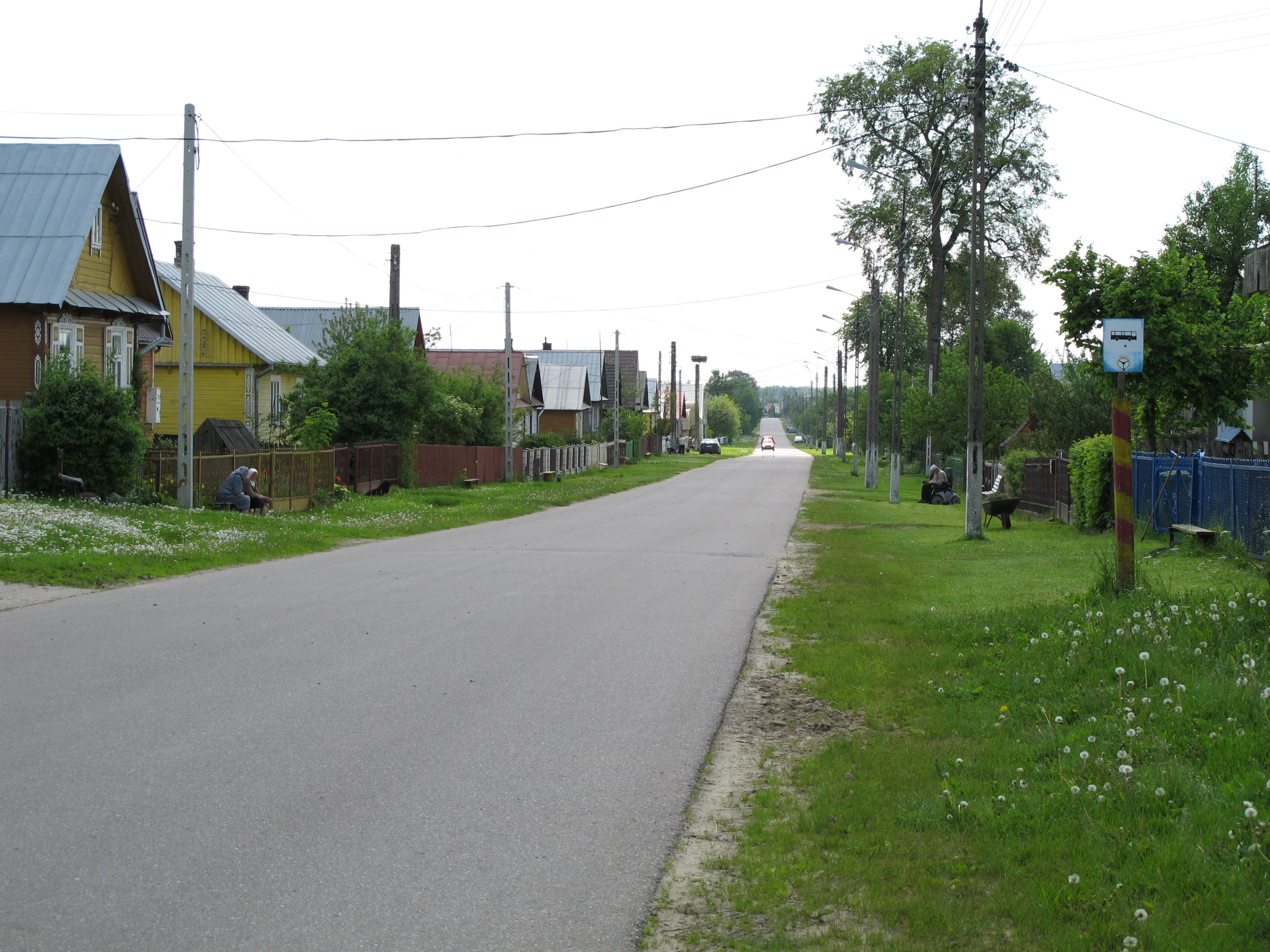

- Location within Poland
- Coordinates: 52°56′N 23°13′E
- Country: Poland
- Voivodeship: Podlaskie
- County: Białystok
- Gmina: Juchnowiec Kościelny
- Population (2021): 137

Wojszki [ˈvɔi̯ʂkʲi] is a village in the administrative district of Gmina Juchnowiec Kościelny, within Białystok County, Podlaskie Voivodeship, in north-eastern Poland.
