= Zajączki, Podlaskie Voivodeship =

Zajączki
- Village
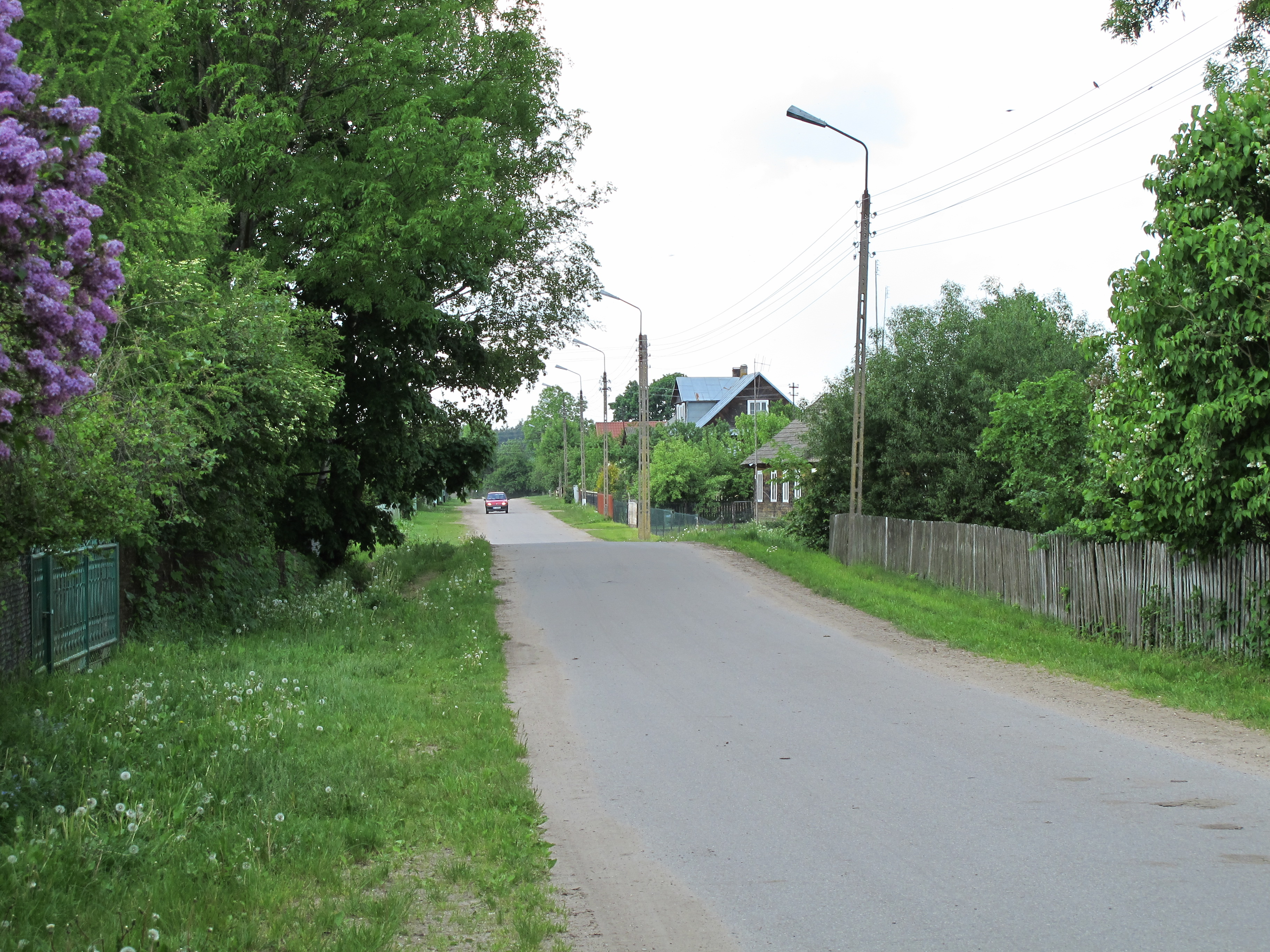

- Location within Poland
- Coordinates: 52°55′5″N 23°10′59″E
- Country: Poland
- Voivodeship: Podlaskie
- County: Białystok
- Gmina: Juchnowiec Kościelny

Zajączki [zaˈjɔnt͡ʂki] is a village in the administrative district of Gmina Juchnowiec Kościelny, within Białystok County, Podlaskie Voivodeship, in north-eastern Poland.
