= Mańkowizna =

- Village
- Location within Poland
- Coordinates: 53°1′40″N 23°7′47″E
- Country: Poland
- Voivodeship: Podlaskie
- County: Białystok
- Gmina: Juchnowiec Kościelny

Mańkowizna [maɲkɔˈvizna] is a village in the administrative district of Gmina Juchnowiec Kościelny, within Białystok County, Podlaskie Voivodeship, in north-eastern Poland.
