= Kozowszczyzna =

- Settlement
- Location within Poland
- Coordinates: 53°04′30″N 23°07′30″E
- Country: Poland
- Voivodeship: Podlaskie
- County: Białystok
- Gmina: Juchnowiec Kościelny

Kozowszczyzna [kɔzɔfʂˈt͡ʂɨzna] is a settlement in the administrative district of Gmina Juchnowiec Kościelny, within Białystok County, Podlaskie Voivodeship, in north-eastern Poland.
