= Śródlesie, Podlaskie Voivodeship =

Śródlesie
- Village
- Location within Poland
- Coordinates: 53°00′51″N 23°05′04″E
- Country: Poland
- Voivodeship: Podlaskie
- County: Białystok
- Gmina: Juchnowiec Kościelny
- Population: 150

Śródlesie [ɕrudˈlɛɕɛ] is a village in the administrative district of Gmina Juchnowiec Kościelny, within Białystok County, Podlaskie Voivodeship, in north-eastern Poland.
