= Rostołty =

- Village
- Location within Poland
- Coordinates: 52°58′N 23°8′E
- Country: Poland
- Voivodeship: Podlaskie
- County: Białystok
- Gmina: Juchnowiec Kościelny

Rostołty [rɔsˈtɔu̯tɨ] is a village in the administrative district of Gmina Juchnowiec Kościelny, within Białystok County, Podlaskie Voivodeship, in north-eastern Poland.
