= Hołówki Duże =

- Village
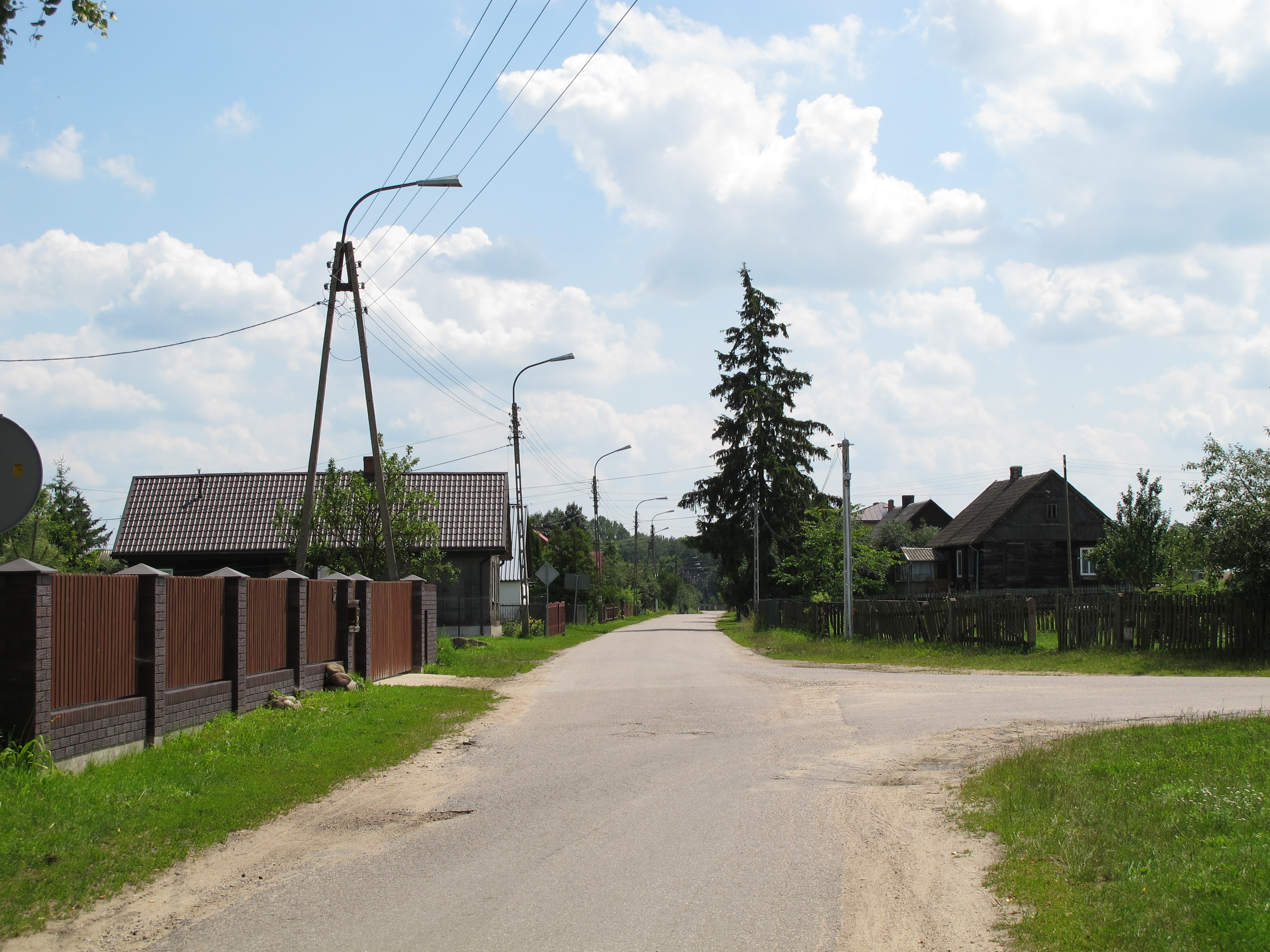

- Location within Poland
- Coordinates: 52°58′27″N 23°5′23″E
- Country: Poland
- Voivodeship: Podlaskie
- County: Białystok
- Gmina: Juchnowiec Kościelny

Hołówki Duże [xɔˈwufki ˈduʐɛ] is a village in the administrative district of Gmina Juchnowiec Kościelny, within Białystok County, Podlaskie Voivodeship, in north-eastern Poland.
