= Pańki, Gmina Juchnowiec Kościelny =

Village in Gmina Juchnowiec Kościelny, Poland

Pańki
- Village
- Location within Poland
- Coordinates: 52°56′25″N 23°11′07″E
- Country: Poland
- Voivodeship: Podlaskie
- County: Białystok
- Gmina: Juchnowiec Kościelny

Pańki [ˈpaɲki] is a village in the administrative district of Gmina Juchnowiec Kościelny, within Białystok County, Podlaskie Voivodeship, in north-eastern Poland.
