= Kožany =

- Municipality
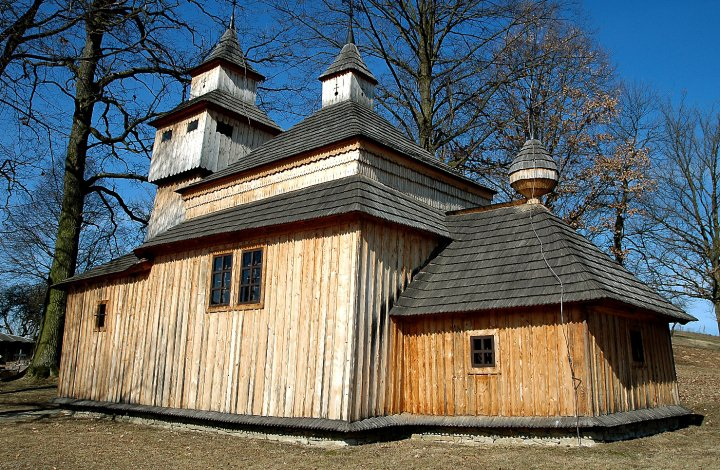

- Flag

- Location of Kožany in the Prešov Region Location of Kožany in Slovakia
- Coordinates: 49.22°N 21.49°E
- Country: Slovakia
- Region: Prešov Region
- District: Bardejov District
- First mentioned: 1427

Area
  - Total: 5.10 km^{2} (1.97 sq mi)
- Elevation: 235 m (771 ft)

Population (2025)
  - Total: 107
- Time zone: UTC+1 (CET)
  - Summer (DST): UTC+2 (CEST)
- Postal code: 861 2
- Area code: +421 54
- Vehicle registration plate (until 2022): BJ

Kožany is a village and municipality in Bardejov District in the Prešov Region of north-east Slovakia.

== History ==
In historical records the village was first mentioned in 1427.

This village is well known by the wooden church, which was built in the past and now it is attraction for the tourists and belongs to the collection of the wooden churches located in the eastern part of Slovakia.

== Geography ==
The municipality lies at an altitude of 235 metres (771 ft) and covers an area of 5.10 km^{2} (1.97 sq mi) (2025).

== Population ==
Population statistic (10 years)
Year	1995	2005	2015	2025
Count	125	135	115	107
Difference		+8%	−14.81%	−6.95%

Population statistic
Year	2024	2025
Count	102	107
Difference		+4.90%

It has a population of 107 people (31 December 2025).

=== Ethnicity ===
Census 2021 (1+ %)
Ethnicity	Number	Fraction
Slovak	82	78.84%
Not found out	21	20.19%
Rusyn	6	5.76%
Romani	2	1.92%
Total	104	

In year 2021 was 104 people by ethnicity 82 as Slovak, 21 as Not found out, 6 as Rusyn and 2 as Romani.

Note on population: The difference values of population numbers in the table "Population statistic" and in the sections "Ethnicity" & "Religion" is caused by the use of various statistical methods.

=== Religion ===
Census 2021 (1+ %)
Religion	Number	Fraction
Greek Catholic Church	40	38.46%
Roman Catholic Church	36	34.62%
Not found out	21	20.19%
None	5	4.81%
Evangelical Church	2	1.92%
Total	104	

In year 2021 was 104 people by religion 40 from Greek Catholic Church, 36 from Roman Catholic Church, 21 from Not found out, 5 from None and 2 from Evangelical Church.

== Genealogical resources ==
The records for genealogical research are available at the state archive "Statny Archiv in Presov, Slovakia"

- Greek Catholic church records (births/marriages/deaths): 1817-1939 (parish B)

== See also ==
- List of municipalities and towns in Slovakia
