= Panki, Kendrapada =

Village in Kendrapada, Odisha, India

Coordinates: 20.777948°N 86.662048°E

Panki is a small village in Kendrapada district in the Indian state of Odisha.
