= Zaleskie, Białystok County =

Zaleskie
- Village
- Location within Poland
- Coordinates: 52°55′55″N 23°10′09″E
- Country: Poland
- Voivodeship: Podlaskie
- County: Białystok
- Gmina: Juchnowiec Kościelny

Zaleskie [zaˈlɛskʲɛ] is a village in the administrative district of Gmina Juchnowiec Kościelny, within Białystok County, Podlaskie Voivodeship, in north-eastern Poland.
