= Ogrodniczki, Gmina Juchnowiec Kościelny =

Ogrodniczki
- Village
- Location within Poland
- Coordinates: 53°03′09″N 23°12′05″E
- Country: Poland
- Voivodeship: Podlaskie
- County: Białystok
- Gmina: Supraśl

Ogrodniczki [ɔɡrɔdˈnit͡ʂki] is a village in the administrative district of Gmina Supraśl, within Białystok County, Podlaskie Voivodeship, in north-eastern Poland.
