= Białystok =

- City county
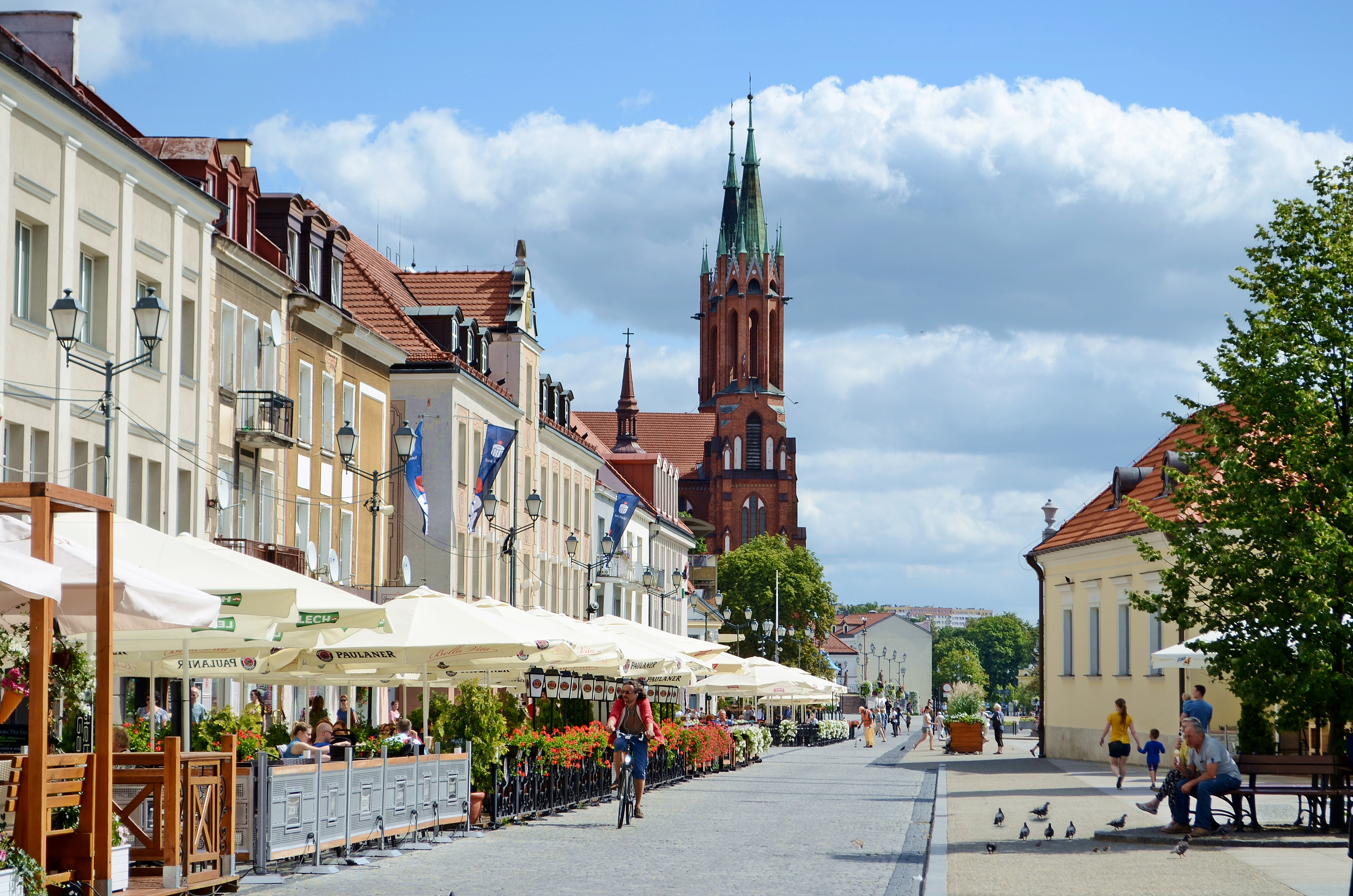
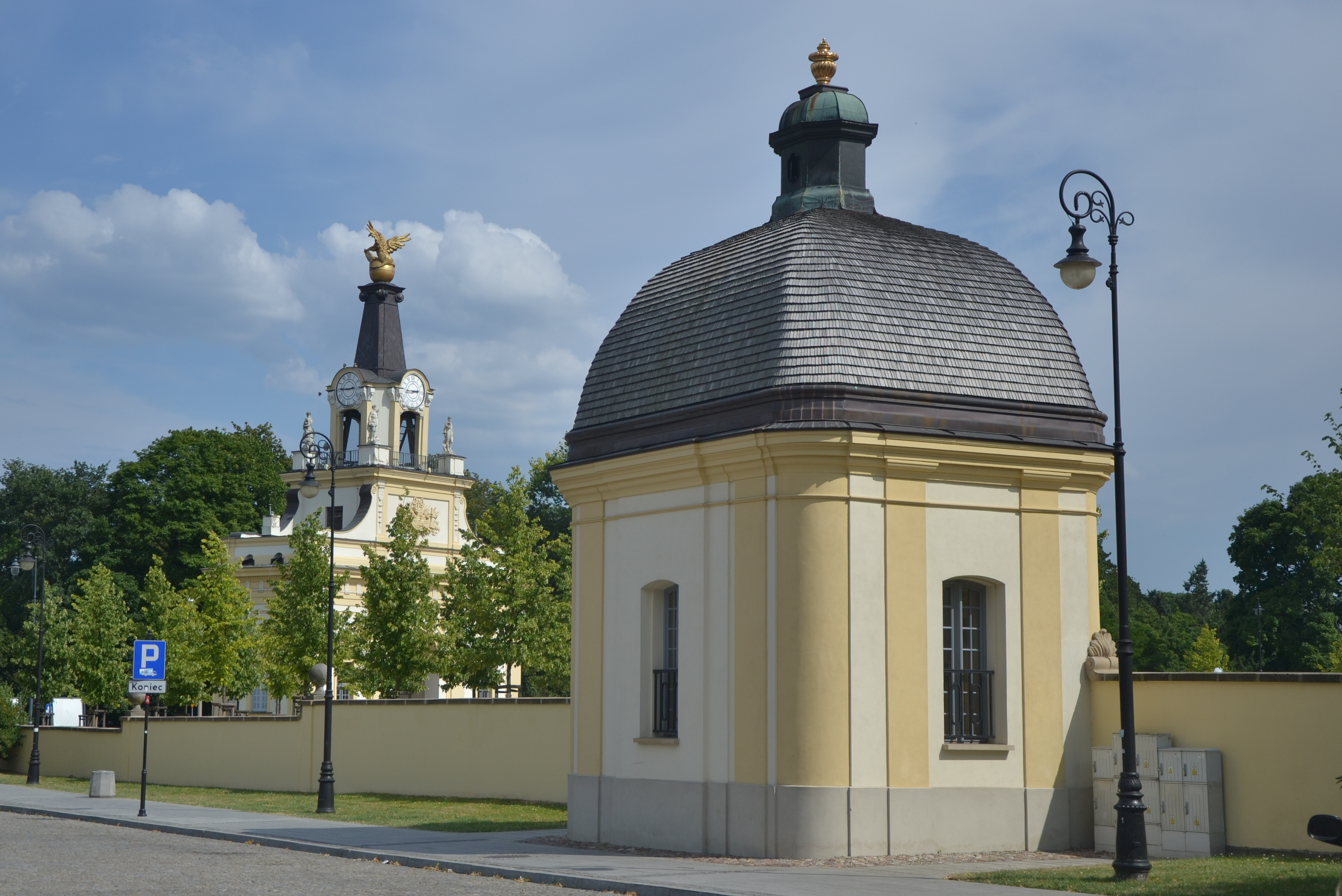
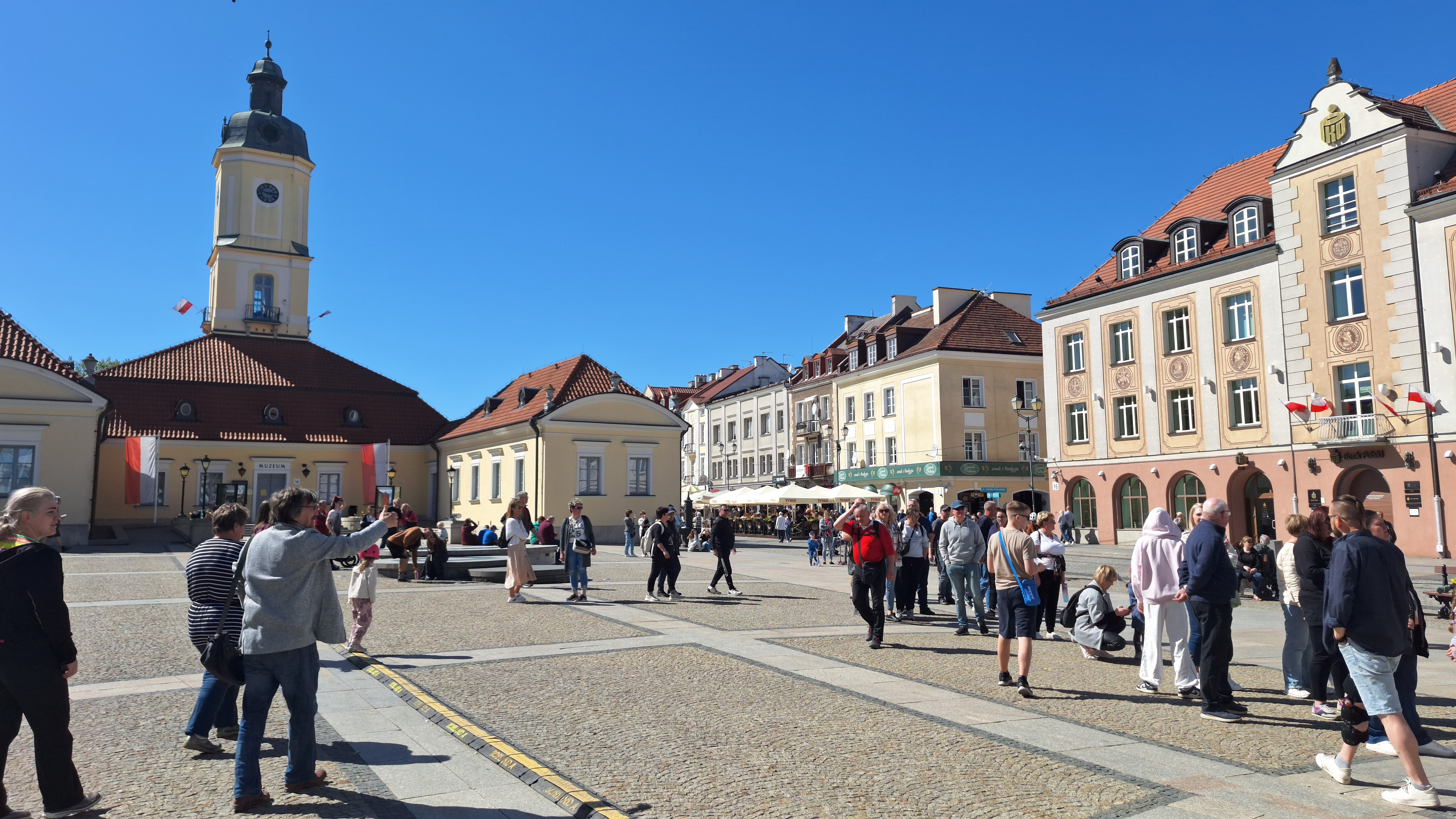
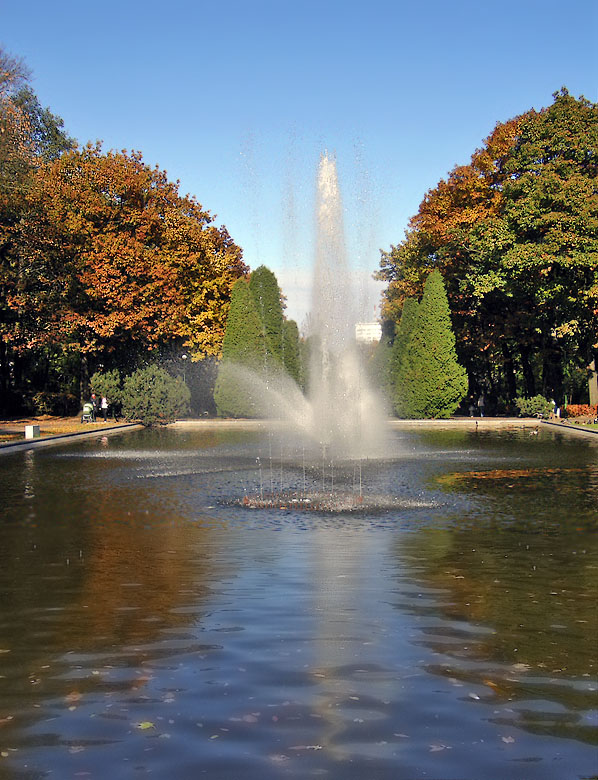
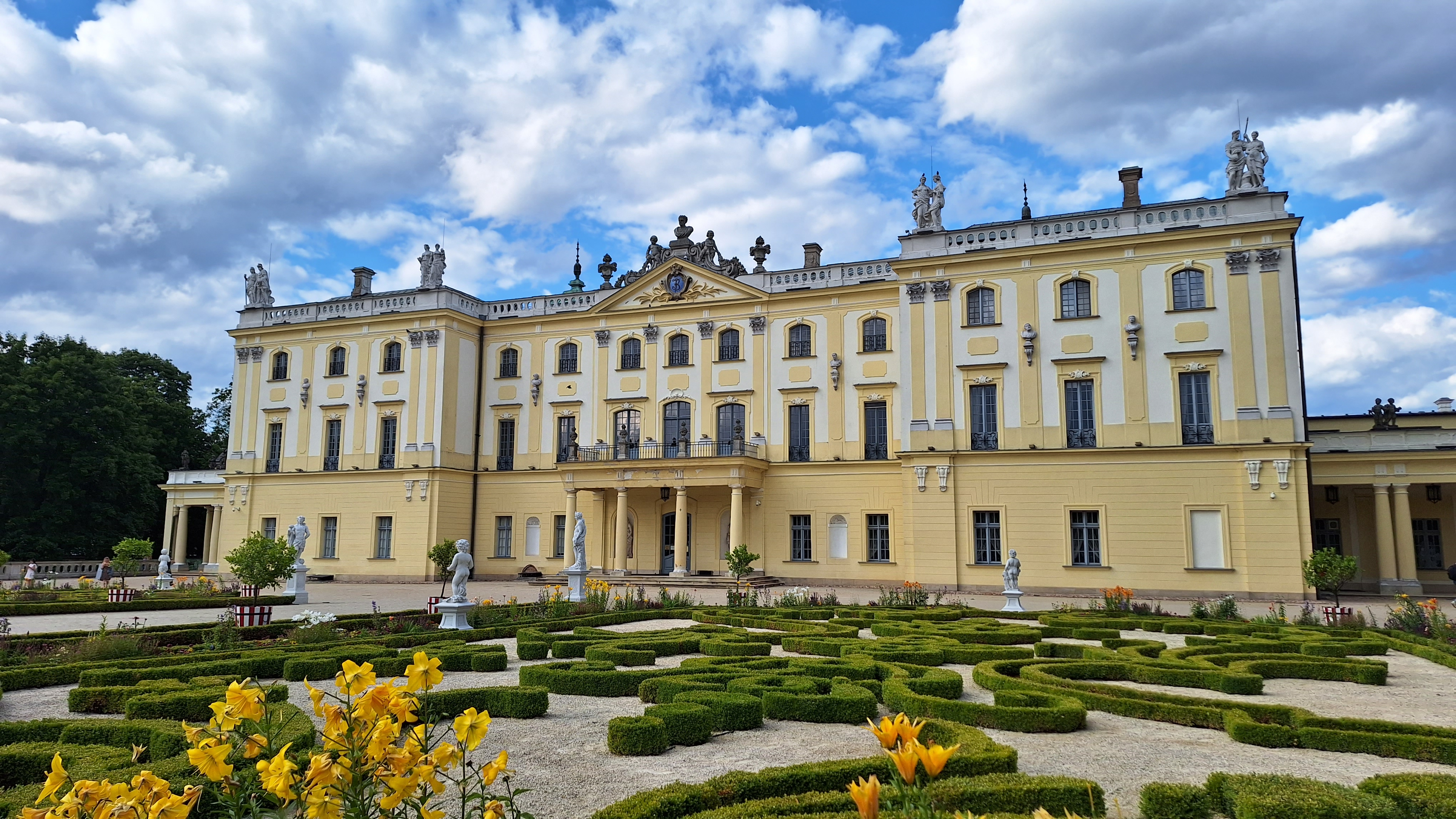
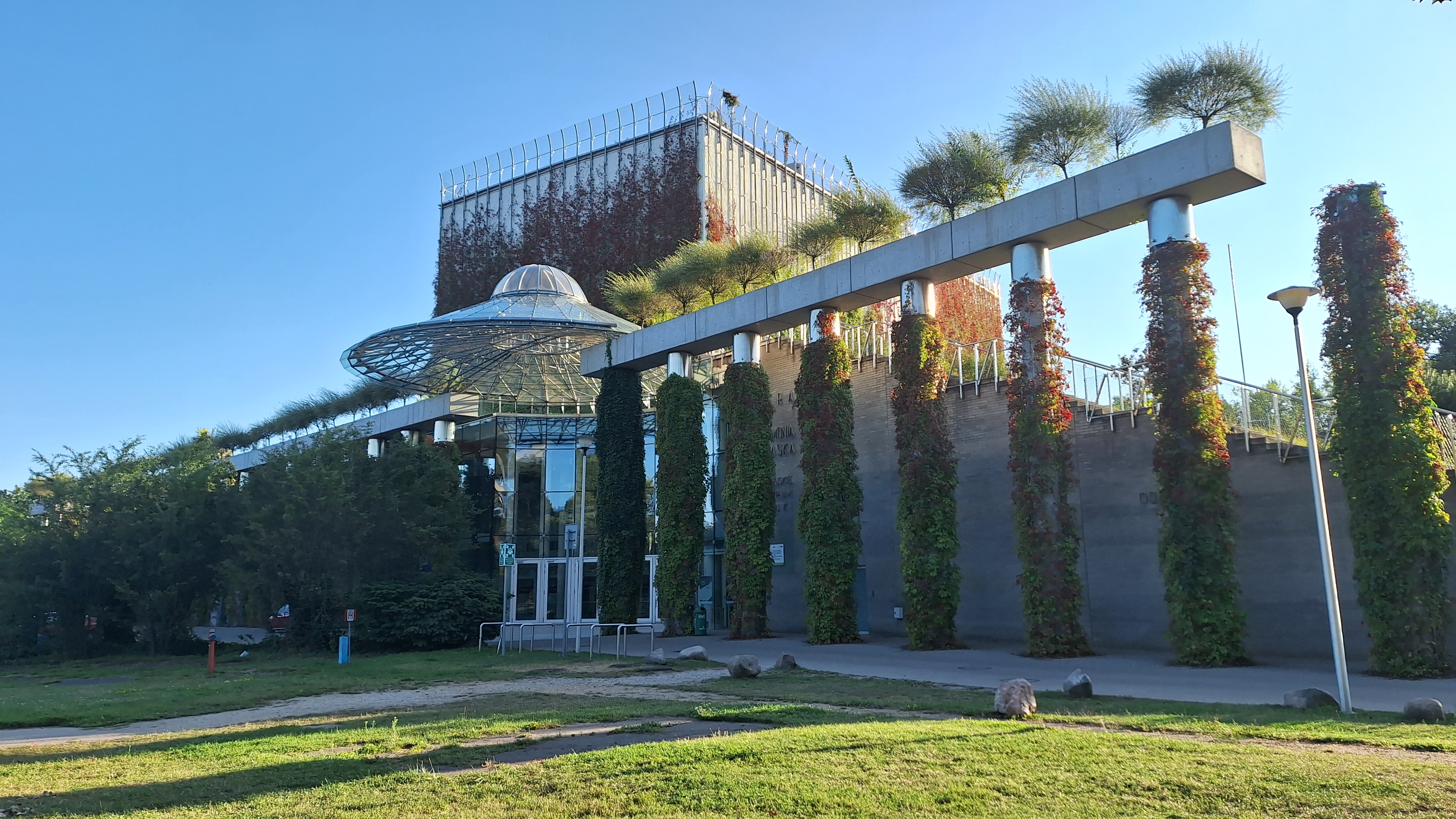
- Cathedral Griffin Gate Kościuszko Square Planty Branicki Palace Podlaska Opera

- Flag Coat of arms Brandmark
- Nicknames: Versailles of Podlachia; Manchester of the North
- Location within Poland
- Coordinates: 53°08′07″N 23°08′44″E
- Country: Poland
- Voivodeship: Podlaskie
- County: city county
- Established: 1437
- City rights: 1692
- Districts: 29: Osiedla: Centrum; Białostoczek; Sienkiewicza; Bojary; Piaski; Przydworcowe; Młodych; Antoniuk; Jaroszówka; Wygoda; Piasta I; Piasta II; Skorupy; Mickiewicza; Dojlidy; Bema; Kawaleryjskie; Nowe Miasto; Zielone Wzgórza; Starosielce; Słoneczny Stok; Leśna Dolina; Wysoki Stoczek; Dziesięciny I; Dziesięciny II; Bacieczki; Zawady; Dojlidy Górne; Bagnówka

Government
  - City mayor: Tadeusz Truskolaski (KO)

Area
  - City county: 102.13 km^{2} (39.43 sq mi)
- Highest elevation: 175 m (574 ft)
- Lowest elevation: 118 m (387 ft)

Population (31 December 2025)
  - City county: 289,217 ▼
  - Rank: 10th in Poland
  - Density: 2,832/km^{2} (7,330/sq mi)
  - Urban: 415,000
  - Metro: 450,000
- Demonym(s): białostoczanin (male) białostoczanka (female) (pl)
- Time zone: UTC+1 (CET)
  - Summer (DST): UTC+2 (CEST)
- Postal code: 15-001 to 15-999
- Area code: +48 85
- Car plates: BI
- Website: www.bialystok.pl

Białystok (Note: Pronunciation: English: UK: /biˈælɪstɒk/ bee-AL-ist-ok, US: /biˈɑːlɪstɔːk, ˈbjɑː-, bjɑːˈwɪstɔːk/ bee-AH-list-awk, BYAH-, byah-WIST-awk; Polish: [bjaˈwɨstɔk].; Other languages: Lithuanian: Bal(t)stogė; Belarusian: Беласток, romanized: Biełastok; Ukrainian: Білосток, romanized: Bilostok, pronounced [biloˈstɔk]; Yiddish: ביאַליסטאָק, romanized: Byalistok; Russian: Белосток, romanized: Belostok, pronounced [bʲɪlɐˈstok]; Latin: Bialostoc.) is the largest city in northeastern Poland and the capital of the Podlaskie Voivodeship. It is the tenth-largest city in Poland, second in terms of population density, and thirteenth in area.

Białystok is located in the Białystok Uplands of the Podlachian Plain on the banks of the Biała River, 200 km (124 mi) northeast of Warsaw. It has historically attracted migrants from elsewhere in Poland and beyond, particularly from Central and Eastern Europe. This is facilitated by the nearby border with Belarus also being the eastern border of the European Union, as well as the Schengen Area. The city and its adjacent municipalities constitute Metropolitan Białystok. The city has a warm summer continental climate, characterized by warm summers and long frosty winters. Forests are an important part of Białystok's character and occupy around 1,846 ha (4,560 acres) (18% of the administrative area of the city) which places it as the fifth-most forested city in Poland.

The first settlers arrived in the 14th century. The town grew and received its municipal charter in 1692. Białystok has traditionally been one of the leading centers of academic, cultural, and artistic life in Podlachia, and the most important economic center in northeastern Poland. Białystok was once an important center for light industry, which was the reason for the substantial growth of the city's population. The city continues to reshape itself into a modern middle-sized city. Białystok, in 2010, was on the short-list, but ultimately lost the competition, to become a finalist for European Capital of Culture in 2016.

== Etymology ==
Although nowadays "stok" is translated as "slope", the initial name of the settlement came from the river flowing through it. In old Polish, biały stok was white river (biały - white, stok - stream; river that "slides" down the slope). Inconspicuous today, the Biała River (usually called Białka), flowing through the city center, gave it its name.

Due to changing borders and demographics over the centuries, the city has been known as Belarusian: Беласток (Byelastok^{?}, Biełastok^{?} [bʲeɫaˈstok]), Yiddish: ביאַליסטאָק (Byalistok, Bjalistok), Lithuanian: Balstogė, and Russian: Белосток (Belostok, Byelostok).

== History ==
=== Early history ===
Archaeological discoveries show that the first settlements in the area of present-day Białystok occurred during the Stone Age. Tombs of ancient settlers can be found in the district of Dojlidy. In the early Iron Age, people settled in the area producing kurgans, the tombs of the chiefs in the area located in the current village of Rostołty. Since then, the Białystok area has been at the crossroads of cultures. Trade routes linking the Baltic to the Black Sea favored the development of settlements with Yotvingia-Ruthenian-Polish cultural characteristics.

Surviving documents attest that around 1437 a representative of the Raczków family, Jakub Tabutowicz of the coat of arms Łabędź, received from Michael Žygimantaitis, son of the Grand Duke of Lithuania Sigismund Kęstutaitis, a wilderness area along the river Biała that marked the beginning of Białystok as a settlement. Thereafter, Białystok was part of Lithuania for 132 years.

=== Polish–Lithuanian Commonwealth ===
The Union of Lublin in 1569 transferred the city to Poland, but it remained very close to its border with the Grand Duchy of Lithuania until the last partition of the Polish–Lithuanian Commonwealth in 1795. Białystok was administratively part of the Podlaskie Voivodeship, after 1569 also part of the Lesser Poland Province of the Kingdom of Poland.

From 1547, the settlement was owned by the Wiesiołowski family, which founded the first school. The first brick church and a castle were built between 1617 and 1826. The two-floor castle, designed on a rectangular plan in the Gothic-Renaissance style, was the work of Job Bretfus. Extension of the castle was continued by Krzysztof Wiesiołowski, starost of Tykocin, Grand Marshal of Lithuania since 1635, and husband of Aleksandra Marianna Sobieska. In 1637 he died childless, and as a result, Białystok came under the management of his widow. After her death in 1645 the Wiesiołowski estate, including Białystok, passed to the Crown to cover the costs of maintaining Tykocin Castle. In the years 1645–1659 Białystok was managed by the starosts of Tykocin.

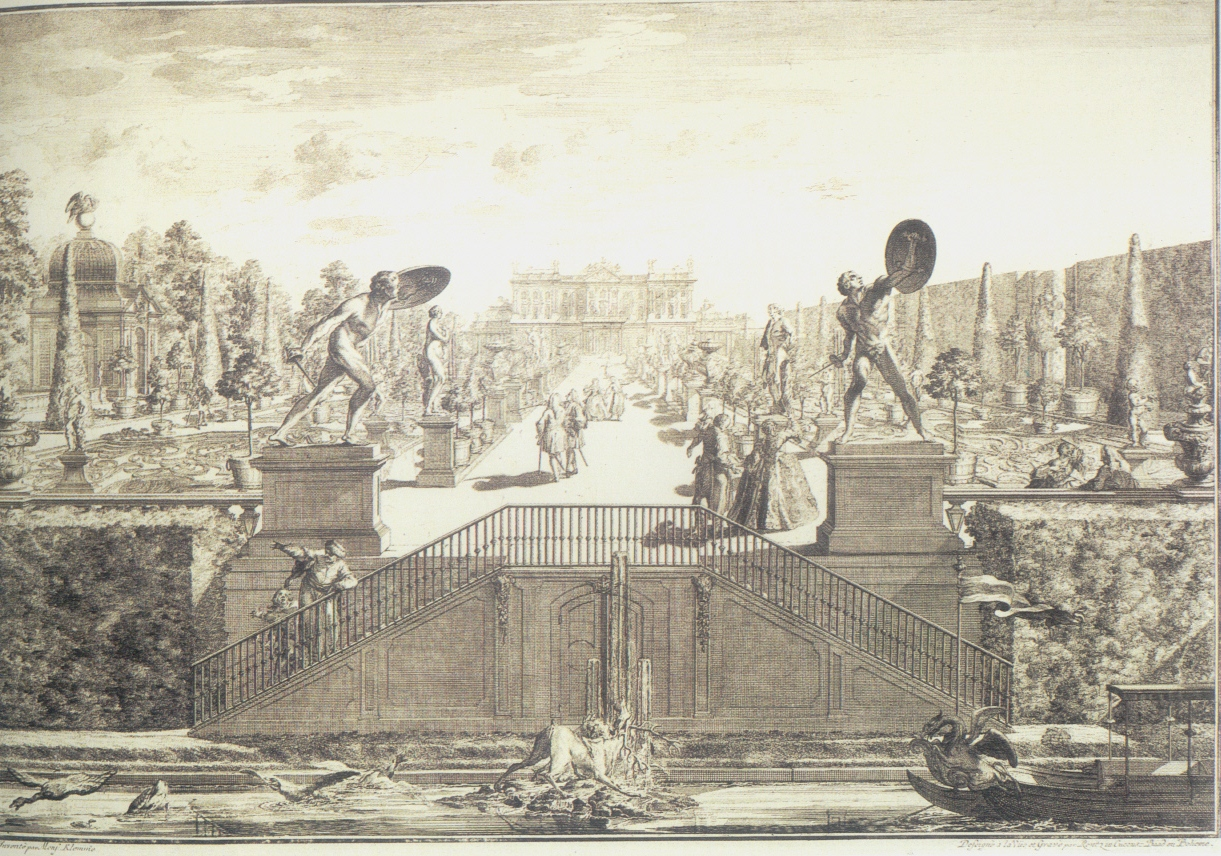
Garden of the Branicki Palace in the 18th century

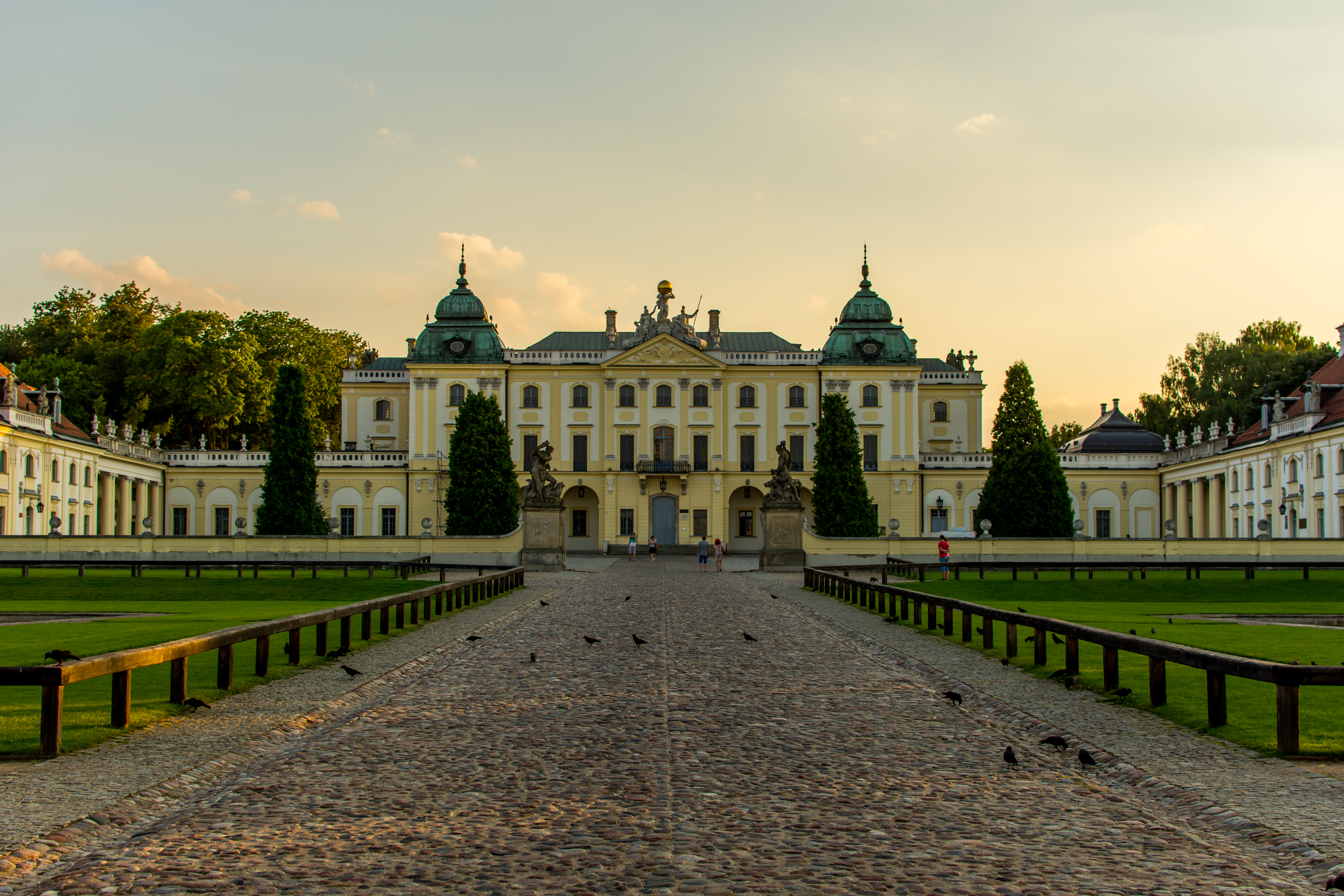
Branicki Palace, also known as the "Polish Versailles", which once belonged to Jan Klemens Branicki

In 1661 it was given to Stefan Czarniecki as a reward for his service in the victory over the Swedes during the Deluge. Four years later, it was given as a dowry of his daughter Aleksandra, who married Marshal of the Crown Court Jan Klemens Branicki, thus passing into the hands of the Branicki family. In 1692, Stefan Mikołaj Branicki, the son of Jan Klemens Branicki, obtained city rights for Białystok from King John III Sobieski. He constructed the Branicki Palace on the foundations of the castle of the Wiesiołowski family. In the first half of the eighteenth century the ownership of the city was inherited by Field Crown Hetman Jan Klemens Branicki. It was he who transformed the palace built by his father into a magnificent residence of a great noble, which was frequently visited by Polish kings and poets.

In 1745 the first military technical school in Poland was founded in Białystok, and in 1748, one of the oldest theaters in Poland, the Komedialnia, was founded in the city. New schools were established, including a ballet school in connection with the foundation of the theater. In 1749, King Augustus III of Poland extended the city limits. In 1770, under the auspices of Izabella Poniatowska, a midwifery school was founded, based on which the Institute of Obstetrics was established in 1805. Białystok was a regional brewing center with 33 breweries as of 1771, with the Podlachian Beer now listed as a protected traditional beverage by the Ministry of Agriculture and Rural Development of Poland.

=== Partition era and industrial growth ===
The end of the eighteenth century saw the division of the Polish–Lithuanian Commonwealth, in three partitions, among Poland's neighboring states. The Kingdom of Prussia subjugated Białystok and the surrounding region during the 1795 third partition. That year, the city became the capital of the New East Prussia province.

Napoleon Bonaparte's victory in the War of the Fourth Coalition freed the territory but as a result in the Treaties of Tilsit in 1807 the area was transferred to the Russian Empire (rather than Congress Poland), which organized the region into the Belostok Oblast, with the city as the regional center. Schooling and higher learning in Białystok, which was intensively developed in the 18th century, was stopped as a result of partitions.

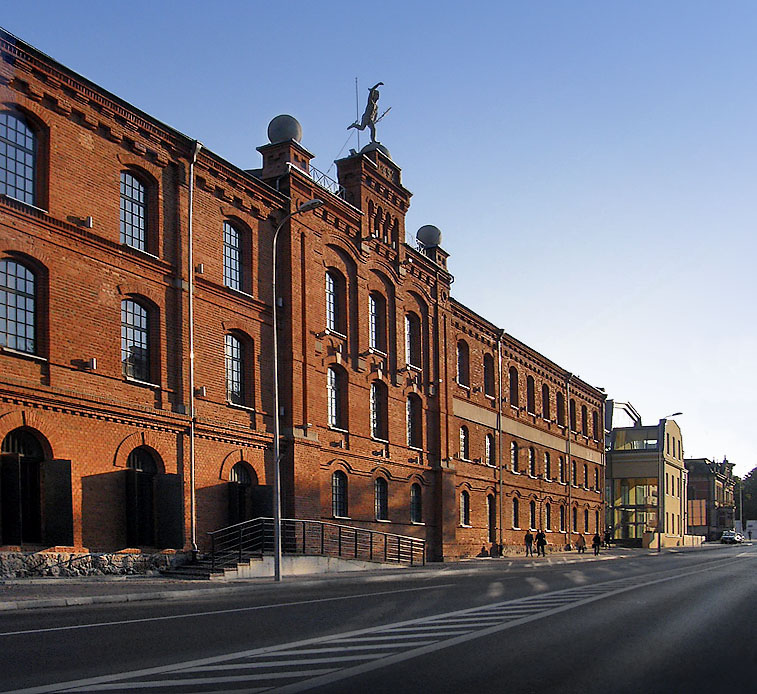
One of the former textile factories, now a shopping mall

Białystok received city rights the latest from all of Podlasie's cities, but at the end of the 19th century it outgrown all the surrounding cities. The rapid development in the 19th century is related to two historical events: the creation of a customs border between the Russian Empire and the Congress Kingdom of Poland, and the opening in 1862 of the Warsaw Saint Petersburg railway line, connecting Białystok with Warsaw, Grodno, Vilnius and Saint Petersburg. Very convenient communication conditions influenced the development and concentration of Białystok's production plants at that time. Along with the administrative function, Białystok received many economic institutions. In the second half of the 19th century, Białystok grew into a significant center of the textile industry, the largest after Łódź in then-partitioned Poland. Białystok was the largest industrial center between Warsaw and Łódź in the west, Saint Petersburg in the north and Moscow in the east, and was nicknamed "Manchester of the North". After the failed November and January uprisings, Russification policies and anti-Polish repressions intensified, and after 1870 a ban on the use of Polish in public places was introduced. In 1912, a Tsarist prison was built, which also served as a transit prison for Poles deported to Siberia.

At the end of the nineteenth century, due to Russian discriminatory regulations, the majority of the city's population was Jewish. According to Russian census of 1897, out of the total population of 66,000, Jews constituted 41,900 (so around 63% percent). This heritage can be seen on the Jewish Heritage Trail in Białystok. The Białystok pogrom occurred between 14 and 16 June 1906 with some 81 to 88 Jews killed by the Russians, and about 80 wounded.

The first anarchist groups to attract a significant following of Russian workers or peasants were the anarcho-communist Chernoe-Znamia groups, founded in Białystok in 1903.

During World War I the Bialystok-Grodno District was the administrative division of German-controlled territory of Ober-Ost. It comprised the city, as the capital, and the surrounding Podlaskie region, roughly corresponding to the territory of the earlier Belostok Oblast.

=== Second Polish Republic ===
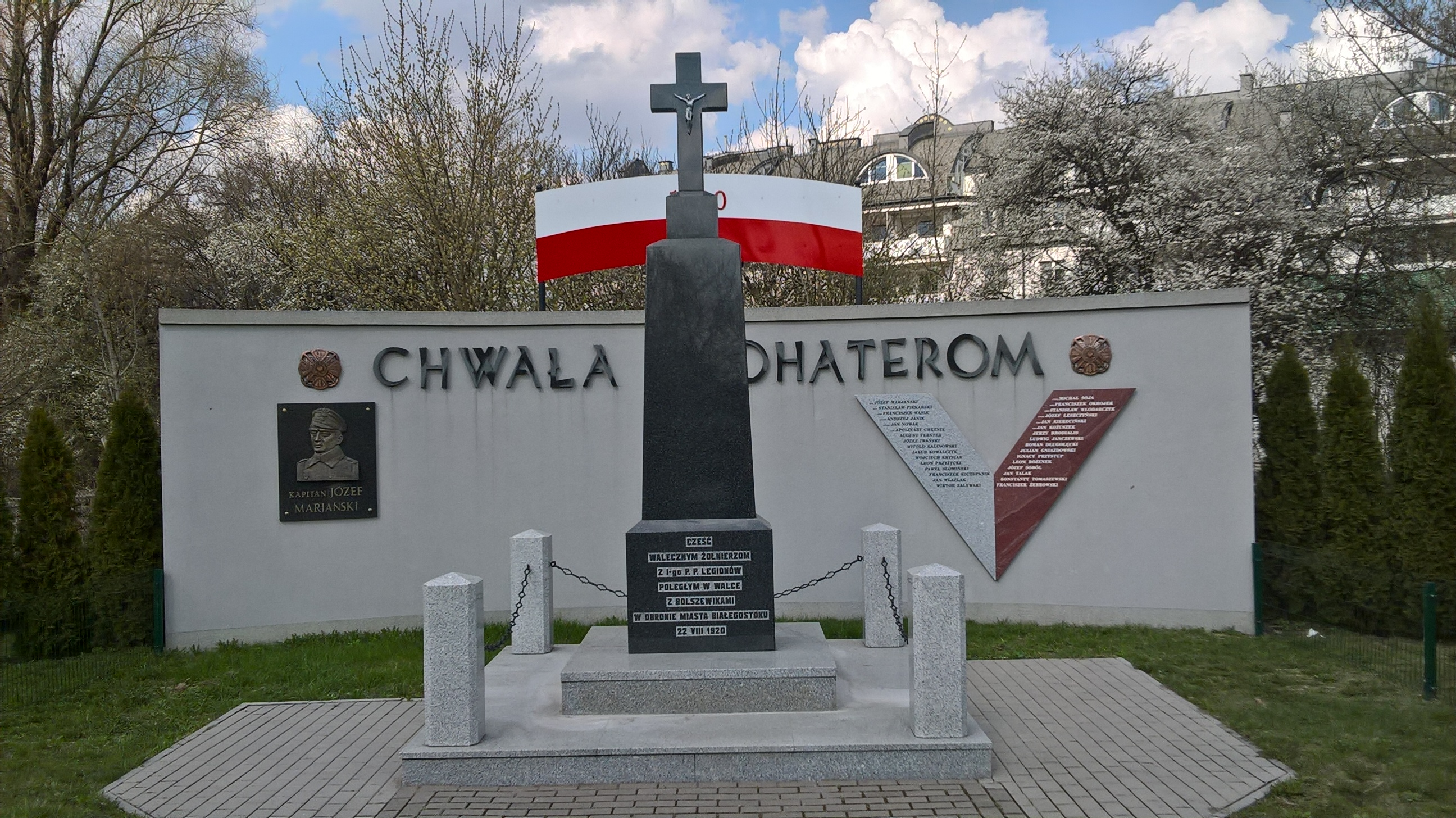
Monument to soldiers of the 1st Legions Infantry Regiment who died in the Battle of Białystok in 1920, Antoniuk district

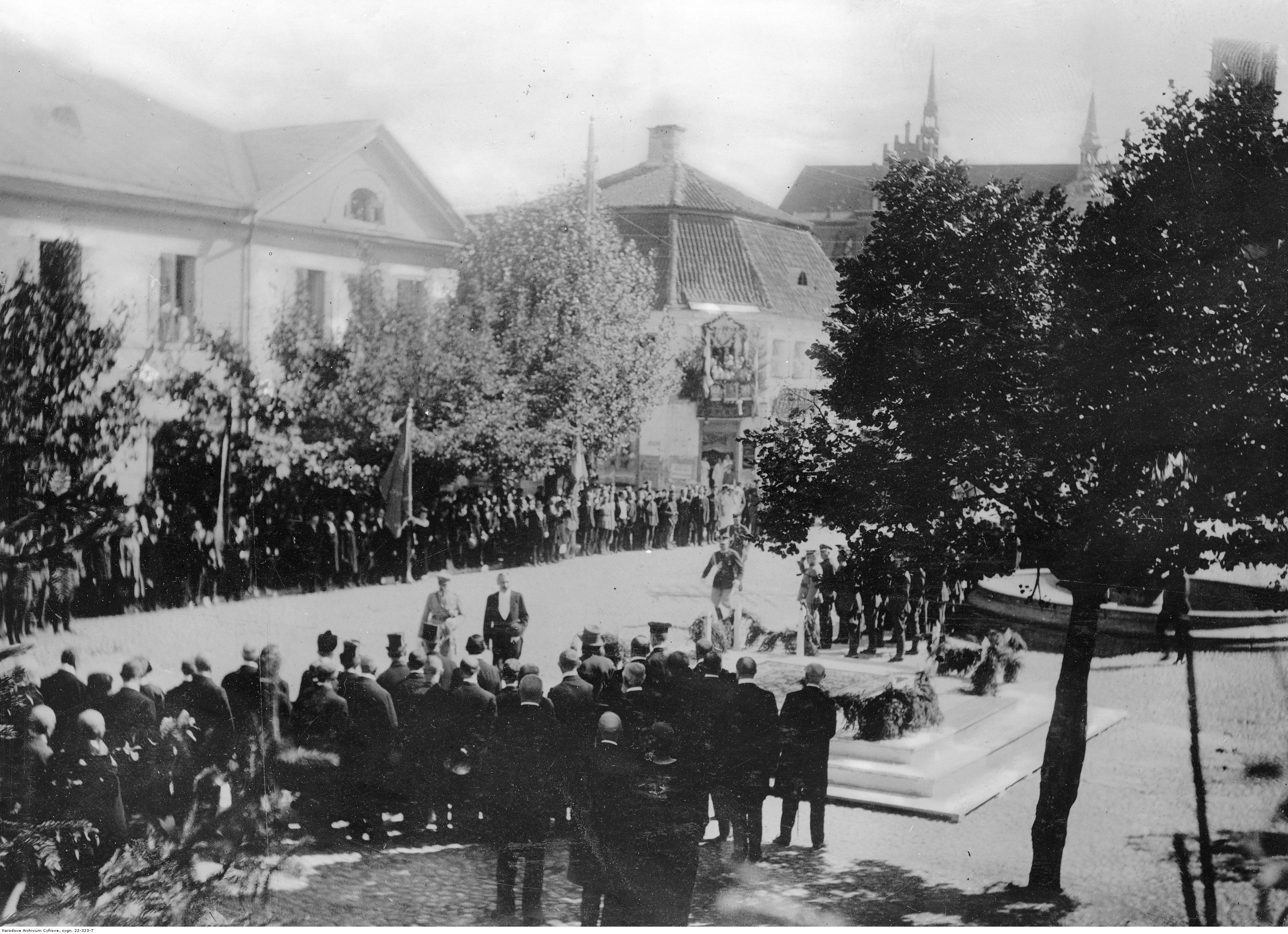
Józef Piłsudski's visit to Białystok in 1921

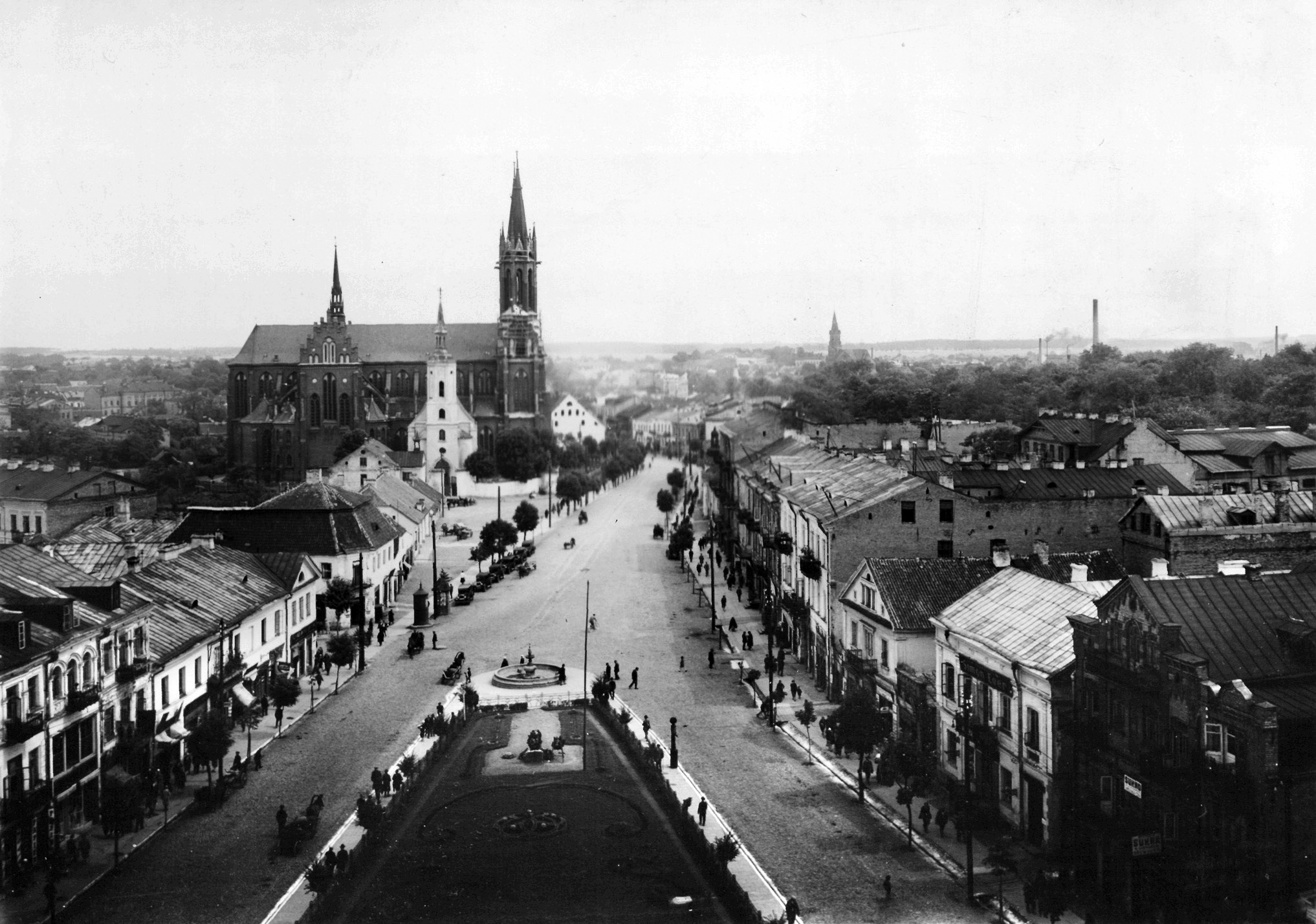
Białystok in the interbellum

At the end of World War I the city became part of the newly independent Second Polish Republic, as the capital of the Białystok Voivodeship. Białystok and the surroundings areas regained independence only on 19 February 1919, three months after the rest of Poland, due to delay in the departure of the German Army from the city. During the 1919–1920 Polish–Soviet War, possession of the city by the Red Army and the Provisional Polish Revolutionary Committee occurred during the lead up to the Battle of Warsaw. During the resultant counteroffensive, the city returned to Polish control after the Battle of Białystok.

After the wars and the reestablishment of independent Poland, Polish education in Białystok was restored and the textile industry was revived. A municipal public library was established, sports clubs were founded, including Jagiellonia Białystok, and in the 1930s a drama theater was built.

=== World War II ===
With the beginning of World War II, Poland was invaded by Nazi Germany and the Soviet Union. City president Seweryn Nowakowski established the Citizens' Guard. Due to the need to evacuate the police forces, the Guard took over its duties after 11 September 1939. In addition to the Police, a group of officials left along with selected archives. However, most of the residents of Białystok remained in the city. Initially Białystok was briefly occupied by Germany, and the German Einsatzgruppe IV entered the city on 20–21 September 1939 to commit crimes against the population. After occupying Białystok, the Germans established the Military City Command, which ordered the surrender of weapons and ammunition and the disbandment of the Citizens' Guard. On 20 September, a brutal murder was committed in the courtyard of Primary School No. 1, where a transit camp for prisoners had been set up earlier. Wehrmacht soldiers murdered 8 people "for disobedience". The next day, German troops began to withdraw from the city, where they were replaced by Red Army units, as a result of the Molotov–Ribbentrop Pact.

Under Soviet occupation, it was incorporated into the Byelorussian SSR from 1939 to 1941 as the capital of Belastok Region and became a subject to massive sovietization. Polish people were subject to deportations deep into the USSR (Siberia, Kazakhstan, Far North). Pre-war mayor Seweryn Nowakowski was arrested by the NKVD in October 1939 and probably also deported to the USSR, however his fate remains unknown. The NKVD took over the local prison. The Polish resistance movement was active in the city, which was the seat of one of the six main commands of the Union of Armed Struggle in occupied Poland (alongside Warsaw, Kraków, Poznań, Toruń and Lwów). Białystok native and future President of Poland in exile Ryszard Kaczorowski was a member of the local Polish resistance and was arrested in the city by the NKVD in 1940. Initially the Soviets sentenced him to death, but eventually he was sentenced to 10 years in forced labor camps and deported to Kolyma, from where he was released in 1942, when he joined the Anders' Army.

In the course of the German invasion of the Soviet Union in 1941, Białystok was occupied by the German Army on 27 June 1941, during the Battle of Białystok–Minsk, and the city became the capital of Bezirk Białystok, a separate region in German occupied Poland, until 1944. Between 27 June and 13 July the 1941 Białystok massacres took place. The Great Synagogue was burnt down by Germans on 27 June 1941, with an estimated 2,000 Jews inside. From the very beginning, the Nazis pursued a ruthless policy of pillage and removal of the non-German population. The Germans operated a Nazi prison in the city, and a forced labour camp for Jewish men. Since 1943, the Sicherheitspolizei carried out deportations of Poles including teenage boys from the local prison to the Stutthof concentration camp. The 56,000 Jewish residents of the town were confined in a ghetto. On 15 August 1943, the Białystok Ghetto Uprising began, and several hundred Polish Jews and members of the Anti-Fascist Military Organisation (Polish: Antyfaszystowska Organizacja Bojowa) started an armed struggle against the German troops who were carrying out the planned liquidation of the ghetto with deportations to the Treblinka extermination camp. Ultimately the ghetto was liquidated, and the vast majority of its remaining 40,000 occupants including men, woman and children, were murdered by the Nazis and their collaborators, primarily at the Treblinka death camp.

The city fell under the control of the Red Army on 27 July 1944. The Soviets carried out mass arrests of Polish resistance members in the city and region, and imprisoned them in Białystok. On 20 September 1944 the city was transferred back to Poland, although with a Soviet-installed communist regime, which stayed in power until the Fall of Communism in the 1980s, and the Soviet NKVD and SMERSH continued the persecution of the Polish resistance in the following months. From November 1944 to January 1945, the Russians deported nearly 5,000 Poles from the local prison to the Soviet Union. Later on, the Soviet-appointed communists held political prisoners and other members of the Polish resistance in the local prison, and until 1956, they also carried out burials of executed Polish resistance members there.

=== Post-war period ===
After the war, the city became capital of the initial Białystok Voivodeship of the People's Republic of Poland. After the 1975 administrative reform, the city was the capital of the now smaller Białystok Voivodeship. Since 1999 it has been the capital of the Podlaskie Voivodeship, Republic of Poland.

From the European Regional Development Fund, contracted within the framework of the Integrated Regional Development Operational Programme (ZPORR), Białystok received approximately PLN 43 million for a project to improve the quality of the transport system. The implementation of Part I of the project allowed for the purchase of 43 new buses for public transport in 2005–2006, and new streets were built in Bacieczki district. The Białystok Waterworks implemented a project to improve water quality. Cycle paths in Białystok were expanded and a path to Supraśl was built.

== Geography ==
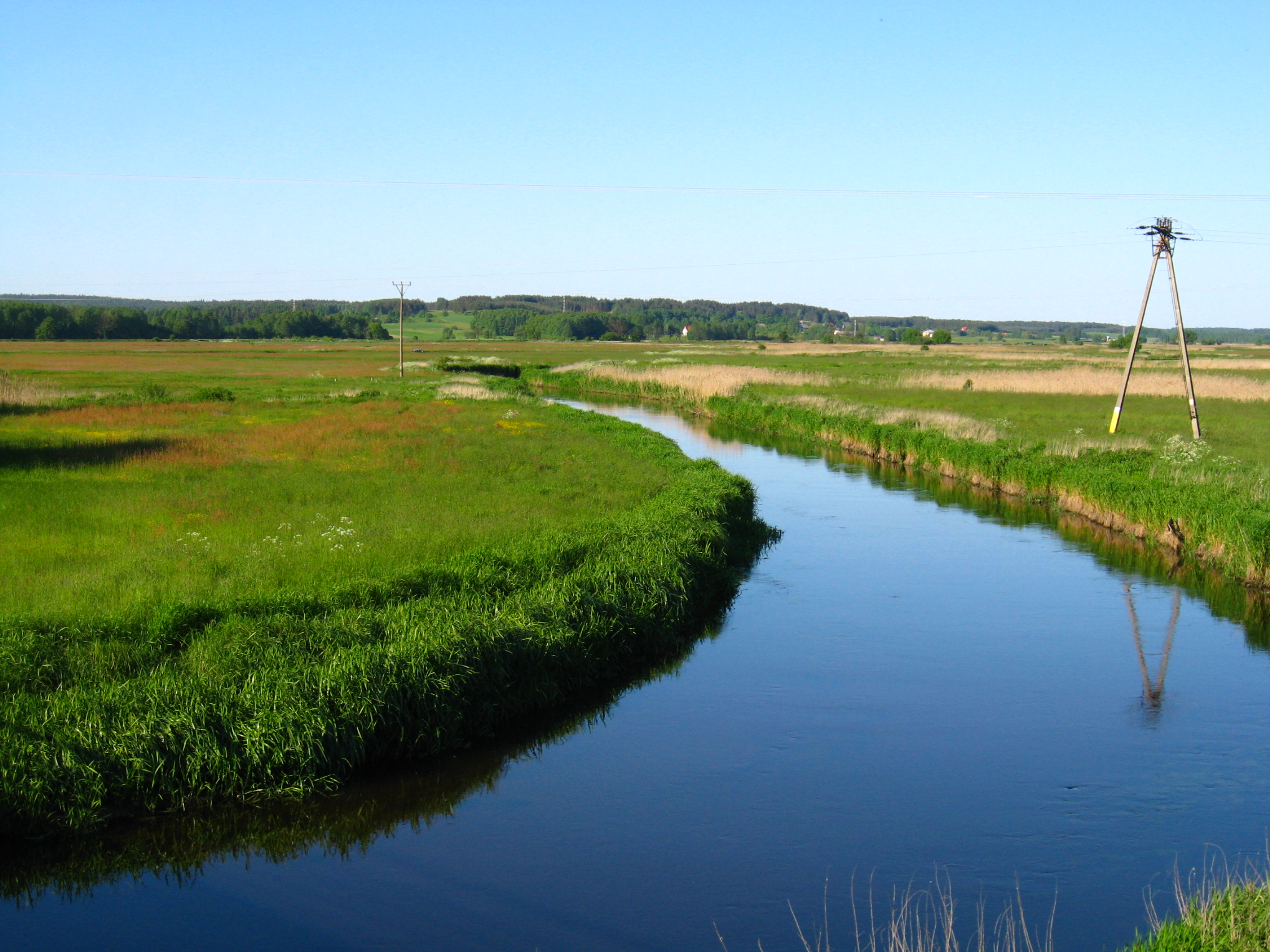
Biała River near Białystok

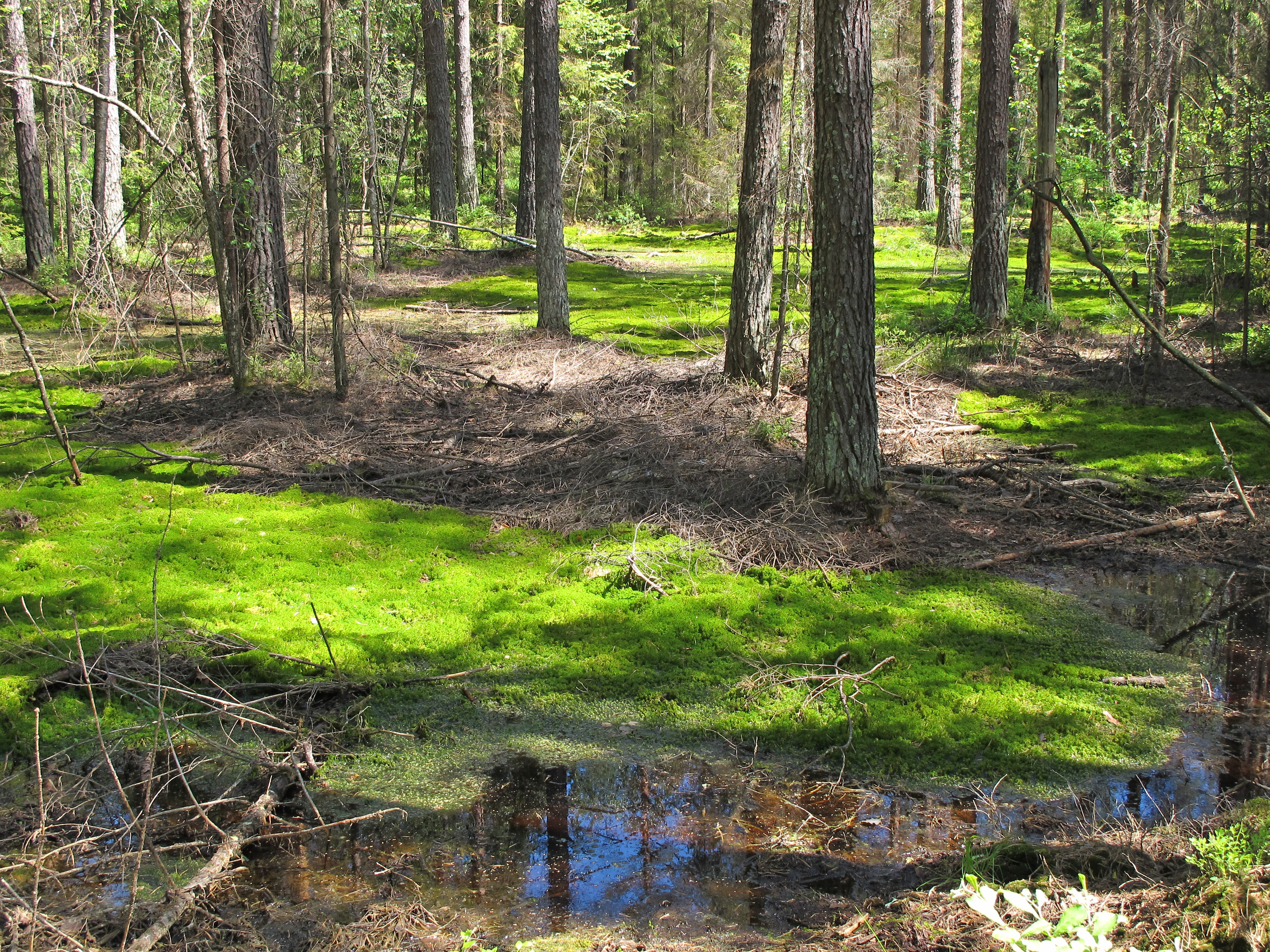
Knyszyn Forest Landscape Park

Białystok is situated in the Białystok Uplands (Polish: Wysoczyzna Białostocka) of the Podlaskie Plain (Polish: Nizina Północnopodlaska), part of what is known collectively as the Green Lungs of Poland. It is situated 197 kilometres (122 mi) by road northeast of Warsaw. It is the biggest Polish city close to Belarus and Lithuania. The Biała River, a left tributary of the Supraśl River, passes through the city. The landscape of the Białystok Upland is diverse, with high moraine hills and kame in excess of 200 m (660 ft) above sea level. Vast areas of outwash, a glacial plain formed of sediments deposited by meltwater at the terminus of a glacier, are covered by forests.

The highest point of the city lies at a height of 175 m (574 ft) on the Pietrasze Forest. The lowest point lies at a height of 118 m (387 ft) on the river valley of the Biała. A characteristic element of the relief of the city area are clear depressions in the surface of the moraine plateau, which are used by the rivers Biała, Horodnianka, and Czaplinianka.

Forests are an important part of the city character, they currently occupy approximately 1,846 ha (4,560 acres) (18% of the administrative area of the city) which places it as the fifth most "wooded" city in Poland; behind Katowice (38%), Bydgoszcz (30%), Toruń (22.9%) and Gdańsk (17.6%).

There are a total of 9 parks in the city (on municipal plots), of which 5 are historic parks with a total area of about 59.06 ha, entered into the municipal register of monuments, and 4 are city parks with an area of about 21.68 ha.

Part of Knyszyn Forest is preserved within the city limits by two nature reserves—a total area of 105 ha (260 acres). The Zwierzyniecki Forest Nature Reserve, which is contained within the city limits, is a fragment, 33.48 ha (82.7 acres), of the riparian forest with a dominant assemblage of oak and hornbeam. The Antoniuk Nature Reserve (Polish: Rezerwat Przyrody Antoniuk) is a 70.07 ha (173.1 acres) park in the city that preserves the natural state of a forest fragment characteristic of the Białystok Upland, with a dominant mixed forest of hazel and spruce.

The 40 ha (99 acres) of forests lying in the vicinity of the Dojlidy Ponds are administered by the Białystok Central Sports and Recreation Center (Polish: Białostocki Ośrodek Sportu i Rekreacji – BOSiR). The Dojlidy Ponds recreation area includes a public beach, walking trails, birdwatching and fishing.

=== Climate ===
The city has a warm-summer humid continental or hemiboreal climate (Dfb) according to the Köppen climate classification system under the 0 °C (32 °F) isotherm for the average temperature of the coldest month, or an oceanic climate (Cfb) if the −3 °C (27 °F) isotherm is used. The city would have been classified as being in the Dfb zone regardless of the accepted isotherm for climatological normals as recent as 1981–2010, but as a consequence of climate change, the winters have warmed up so that the climate in the city may be classified as oceanic. Białystok is one of the coldest cities in Poland by annual temperature and one with the climate having the most continental characteristics, as is the case for much of north-eastern Poland, with the mean yearly temperature of 7.7 °C (46 °F) and the length of the growing season amounting to 205 days, shorter than elsewhere in Poland.

While winters are rather mild compared to other cities on the similar latitude, such as Samara, Barnaul, or Edmonton, they are colder than in Western Europe (in cities like Bremen and Dublin). Winters usually have little sunshine, with weather patterns changing from those influenced by the low-pressure systems generated by the Icelandic Low (when the weather is often cloudy, cool, damp, rainy and/or snowy) to the occasional intrusions of cold air masses from Siberia or the Arctic (Siberian High), which, due to the city's northeasterly location, are more frequent than in other parts of Poland. Winters thus tend to be several degrees colder than elsewhere in Poland. Freezing conditions below −20 °C (−4 °F) are possible in winter but are rare. Snow cover is present on the ground for more than half of winter. Summers tend to be warm, sunny and pleasant and are occasionally hot, but they are still a little cooler than in most of Poland. More rain falls in summer months than in any other period of the year.

The centre of Białystok, as most urban areas, experiences the urban heat island effect, therefore for most of the time, the city is warmer than the surrounding countryside. The temperatures in the city centre are, on average, 2.3 °C (4.1 °F) higher than in the surrounding villages, with greater differences at night and during the warmer half of the year, particularly in spring.

Climate data for Białystok (1991–2020 normals, extremes 1951–present)
| Month | Jan | Feb | Mar | Apr | May | Jun | Jul | Aug | Sep | Oct | Nov | Dec | Year |
|---|---|---|---|---|---|---|---|---|---|---|---|---|---|
| Record high °C (°F) | 15.9 (60.6) | 16.4 (61.5) | 21.8 (71.2) | 29.3 (84.7) | 31.7 (89.1) | 32.8 (91.0) | 36.0 (96.8) | 35.2 (95.4) | 33.6 (92.5) | 25.4 (77.7) | 18.5 (65.3) | 13.8 (56.8) | 36.0 (96.8) |
| Mean maximum °C (°F) | 6.3 (43.3) | 8.2 (46.8) | 15.4 (59.7) | 23.2 (73.8) | 27.0 (80.6) | 29.4 (84.9) | 30.9 (87.6) | 30.8 (87.4) | 25.9 (78.6) | 20.1 (68.2) | 13.2 (55.8) | 7.6 (45.7) | 32.4 (90.3) |
| Mean daily maximum °C (°F) | −0.4 (31.3) | 1.1 (34.0) | 6.1 (43.0) | 13.6 (56.5) | 19.2 (66.6) | 22.2 (72.0) | 24.3 (75.7) | 23.7 (74.7) | 18.1 (64.6) | 11.7 (53.1) | 5.2 (41.4) | 1.0 (33.8) | 12.2 (54.0) |
| Daily mean °C (°F) | −2.8 (27.0) | −1.9 (28.6) | 1.7 (35.1) | 7.9 (46.2) | 13.1 (55.6) | 16.4 (61.5) | 18.4 (65.1) | 17.5 (63.5) | 12.6 (54.7) | 7.4 (45.3) | 2.7 (36.9) | −1.2 (29.8) | 7.7 (45.9) |
| Mean daily minimum °C (°F) | −5.4 (22.3) | −4.9 (23.2) | −2.4 (27.7) | 2.2 (36.0) | 6.8 (44.2) | 10.3 (50.5) | 12.6 (54.7) | 11.6 (52.9) | 7.7 (45.9) | 3.6 (38.5) | 0.2 (32.4) | −3.6 (25.5) | 3.2 (37.8) |
| Mean minimum °C (°F) | −18.5 (−1.3) | −16.3 (2.7) | −11.1 (12.0) | −5.0 (23.0) | −0.7 (30.7) | 3.8 (38.8) | 6.9 (44.4) | 5.3 (41.5) | 0.1 (32.2) | −5.1 (22.8) | −8.3 (17.1) | −14.7 (5.5) | −21.8 (−7.2) |
| Record low °C (°F) | −35.4 (−31.7) | −32.9 (−27.2) | −24.0 (−11.2) | −8.3 (17.1) | −4.5 (23.9) | −0.2 (31.6) | 4.2 (39.6) | 0.2 (32.4) | −5.1 (22.8) | −11.2 (11.8) | −20.7 (−5.3) | −29.3 (−20.7) | −35.4 (−31.7) |
| Average precipitation mm (inches) | 33.8 (1.33) | 31.4 (1.24) | 34.6 (1.36) | 37.7 (1.48) | 69.1 (2.72) | 65.4 (2.57) | 86.5 (3.41) | 69.4 (2.73) | 56.0 (2.20) | 47.2 (1.86) | 39.2 (1.54) | 39.9 (1.57) | 610.2 (24.02) |
| Average extreme snow depth cm (inches) | 10.2 (4.0) | 10.9 (4.3) | 7.5 (3.0) | 2.2 (0.9) | 0.0 (0.0) | 0.0 (0.0) | 0.0 (0.0) | 0.0 (0.0) | 0.0 (0.0) | 0.5 (0.2) | 3.5 (1.4) | 5.5 (2.2) | 10.9 (4.3) |
| Average precipitation days (≥ 0.1 mm) | 16.50 | 14.91 | 14.17 | 11.23 | 12.67 | 13.27 | 14.53 | 11.70 | 11.83 | 12.97 | 15.23 | 16.00 | 165.01 |
| Average snowy days (≥ 0 cm) | 19.6 | 17.8 | 10.0 | 1.3 | 0.0 | 0.0 | 0.0 | 0.0 | 0.0 | 0.6 | 5.0 | 14.4 | 68.7 |
| Average relative humidity (%) | 88.4 | 85.1 | 77.8 | 69.8 | 71.2 | 73.1 | 75.4 | 77.2 | 82.5 | 85.5 | 90.0 | 90.4 | 80.5 |
| Average dew point °C (°F) | −5 (23) | −5 (23) | −2 (28) | 2 (36) | 8 (46) | 11 (52) | 14 (57) | 13 (55) | 10 (50) | 5 (41) | 2 (36) | −2 (28) | 4 (40) |
| Mean monthly sunshine hours | 38.1 | 57.4 | 122.1 | 185.7 | 254.1 | 259.3 | 256.9 | 250.5 | 161.8 | 102.1 | 38.4 | 28.9 | 1,755.3 |
Source 1: Institute of Meteorology and Water Management
Source 2: Meteomodel.pl (records, relative humidity 1991–2020), Time and Date (dewpoints, 2005-2015)

Climate data for Białystok (Dojlidy), elevation: 148 m, 1961-1990 normals and extremes
| Month | Jan | Feb | Mar | Apr | May | Jun | Jul | Aug | Sep | Oct | Nov | Dec | Year |
|---|---|---|---|---|---|---|---|---|---|---|---|---|---|
| Record high °C (°F) | 10.9 (51.6) | 16.4 (61.5) | 21.8 (71.2) | 27.4 (81.3) | 30.1 (86.2) | 32.4 (90.3) | 34.8 (94.6) | 34.6 (94.3) | 29.8 (85.6) | 25.4 (77.7) | 16.8 (62.2) | 13.8 (56.8) | 34.8 (94.6) |
| Mean daily maximum °C (°F) | −2.2 (28.0) | −0.6 (30.9) | 4.4 (39.9) | 12.0 (53.6) | 18.4 (65.1) | 21.5 (70.7) | 22.6 (72.7) | 22.1 (71.8) | 17.4 (63.3) | 11.5 (52.7) | 4.6 (40.3) | 0.2 (32.4) | 11.0 (51.8) |
| Daily mean °C (°F) | −4.8 (23.4) | −3.8 (25.2) | 0.2 (32.4) | 6.7 (44.1) | 12.9 (55.2) | 16.1 (61.0) | 17.3 (63.1) | 16.3 (61.3) | 12.0 (53.6) | 7.2 (45.0) | 2.2 (36.0) | −2.1 (28.2) | 6.7 (44.0) |
| Mean daily minimum °C (°F) | −7.7 (18.1) | −6.8 (19.8) | −3.4 (25.9) | 1.9 (35.4) | 7.0 (44.6) | 10.2 (50.4) | 11.7 (53.1) | 11.1 (52.0) | 7.6 (45.7) | 3.6 (38.5) | −0.1 (31.8) | −4.6 (23.7) | 2.5 (36.6) |
| Record low °C (°F) | −35.4 (−31.7) | −32.9 (−27.2) | −24.0 (−11.2) | −8.3 (17.1) | −4.5 (23.9) | 0.7 (33.3) | 5.0 (41.0) | 0.2 (32.4) | −5.1 (22.8) | −9.9 (14.2) | −20.7 (−5.3) | −26.2 (−15.2) | −35.4 (−31.7) |
| Average precipitation mm (inches) | 35 (1.4) | 26 (1.0) | 31 (1.2) | 36 (1.4) | 56 (2.2) | 74 (2.9) | 80 (3.1) | 70 (2.8) | 52 (2.0) | 46 (1.8) | 46 (1.8) | 40 (1.6) | 592 (23.2) |
| Average precipitation days (≥ 1.0 mm) | 8.8 | 7.0 | 7.9 | 7.7 | 9.5 | 9.9 | 10.0 | 8.9 | 8.7 | 8.4 | 9.7 | 10.1 | 106.6 |
Source: NOAA

See or edit raw graph data.

=== Urban layout ===
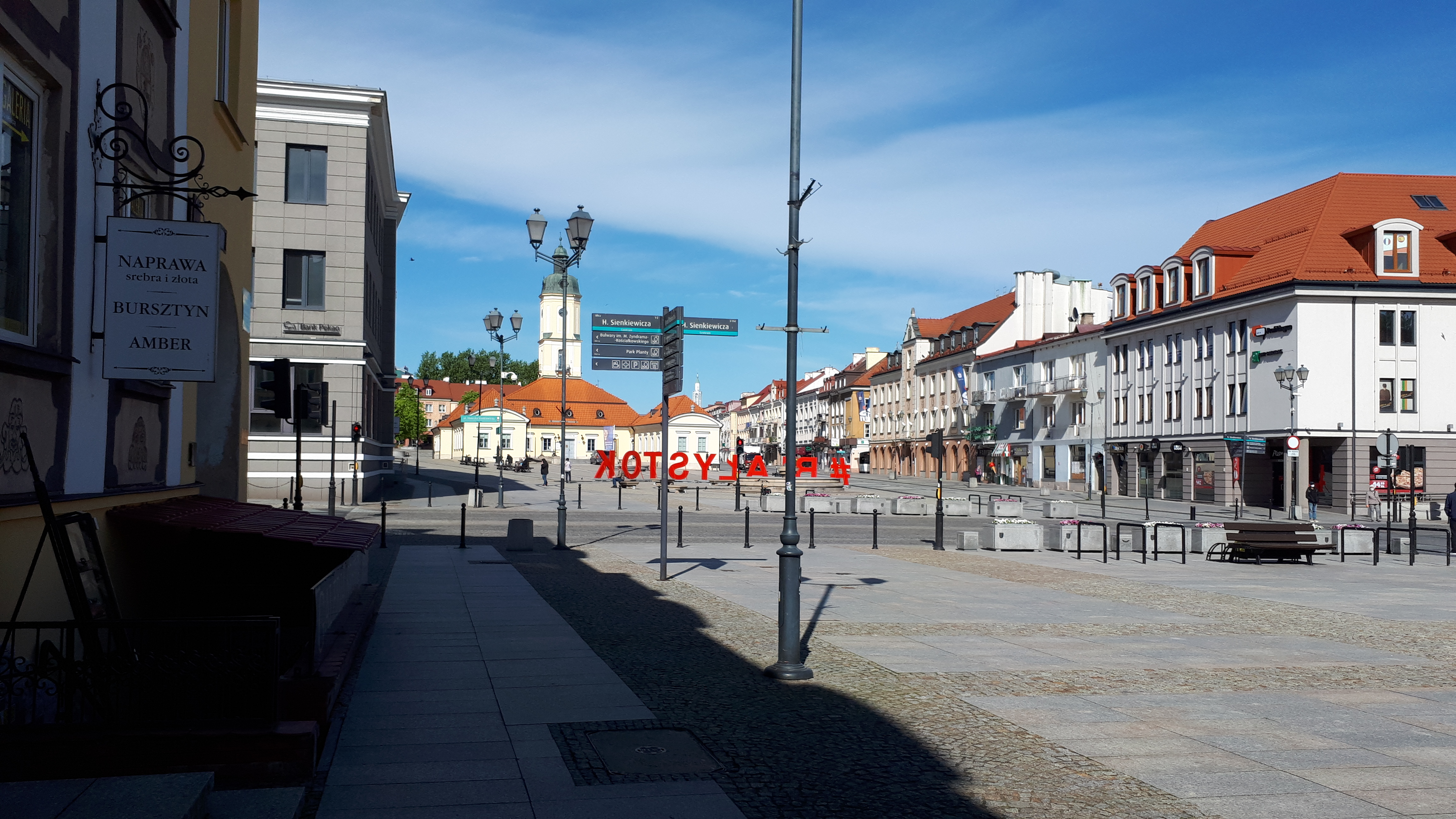
Kościuszko Square in 2020

Białystok is roughly circular, centered around the Central market square and Branicki Palace. The decisive influence on the development of the city was exerted by natural and human factors - the course of roads, the Biała and its tributaries and the layout of railway lines. The choice of land for the construction of the factory was also determined by the price of the plot. The layout of the city, in accordance with the 18th century palace and park layout, emphasizing the magnificence of the residence, hindered the development of the city in width. Two railway lines: Białystok-Suwałki and Białystok-Słonim, separated its northern and eastern parts from the rest of the city: Dziesięciny, Wygoda, Zacisze and Pieczurki. Originally, the city's territory was about 50 hectares. In its early days Białystok was located at the intersection of two local roads and had two most important monuments: a church (with the current brick church from 1626) with an accompanying market square and a Gothic castle owned by the noble Wiesiołowski family, the former owners of the town. The project which was aimed at rebuilding the layout of the city was initiated by Stefan Mikołaj Branicki at the end of the 17th and early 18th centuries. He established a new market (Polish: Nowy Rynek) (part of the western side of Kosciuszki Square with the town hall, located on the western side of Sienkiewicza Street). The route leading towards Suraż was moved to a new location (today's Suraska Street) forming straight road section ending in the southern corner of the market square and creating a new viewing corridor. This design decision made it possible to erect new buildings so that the old part of the settlement and the Jewish quarter were no longer visible. The second viewing corridor was created by shifting the existing route leading towards Choroszcz to the northern corner of the market square.

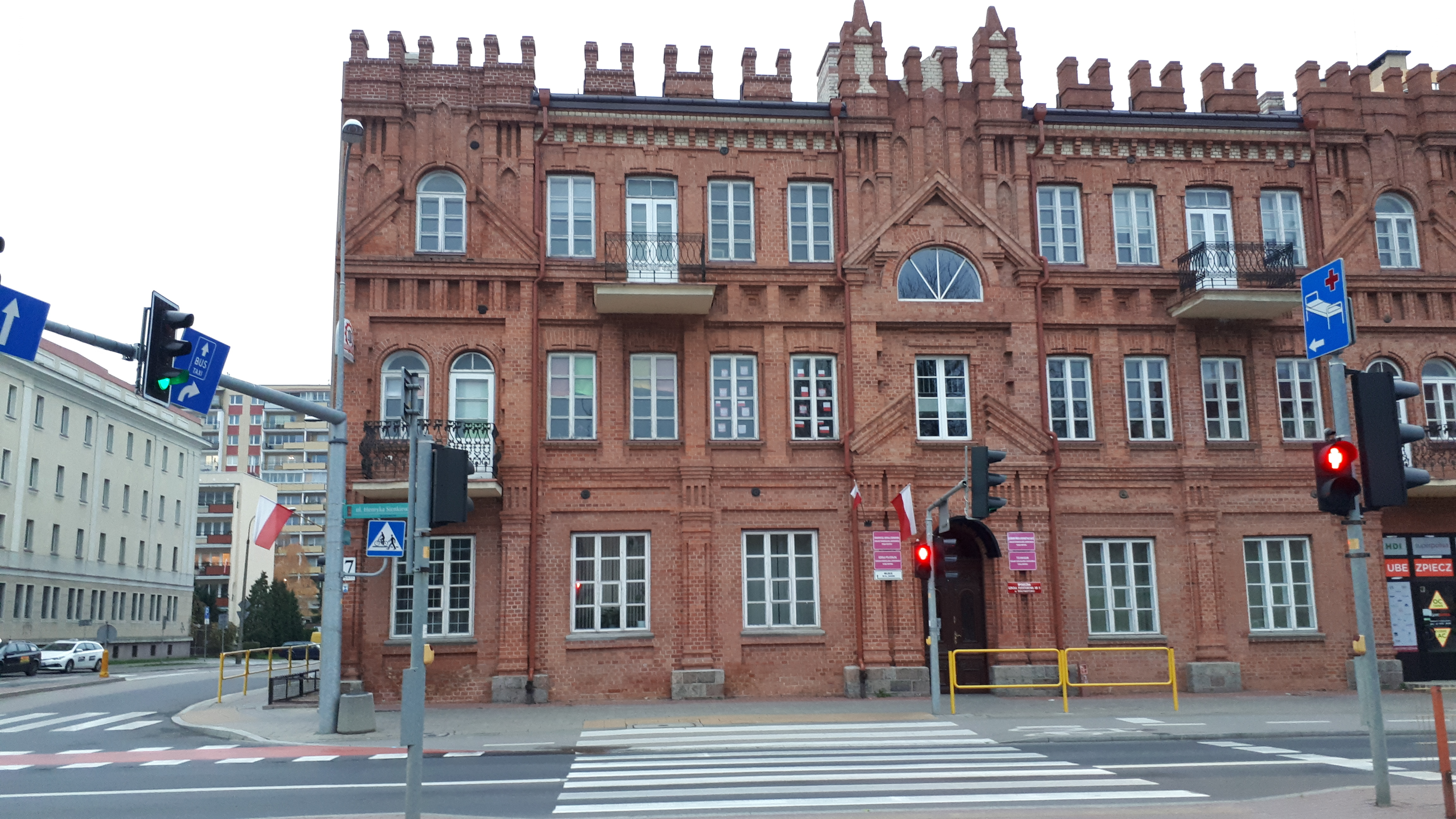
An example of Białystok's urban contrast, with a mix of heritage and contemporary architecture

The communication system serving the entire city was made of streets radiating out from the central market square. An inventory plan made by Becker in 1799 was needed by the Prussian authorities in connection with the negotiations on the acquisition of Białystok for a royal residence. The plan is of fundamental importance as it shows the development of the city in the first period of its creation. The area of the city did not exceed 1.5 km2, and the population was approximately 3,500. The entire urban area was closed with 6 loose-fitting gates and buildings situated on regular plots. Compact buildings were found only in the market square, the frontages of which were 1- 2-storey buildings with brick front elevations. Choroska and Zamkowa Streets were built up with only brick houses. The city was dominated by the palace complex, which, together with the park, covered a substantial area. The residence palace was designed on a European scale and created new development opportunities for Białystok. Following the handover of the city from the Prussian Kingdom to the Russian Empire in the early 19th century, the city began growing in a very fast pace as a result of intensive industrialization, losing its original Baroque composition.

After the First World War, the first attempts were made to organize the city, which had so far developed without plans - between the palace grounds and arable land. At the request of the Association of Polish Cities, in the years 1938-1939 a general urban concept of the city was created by Ignacy Tłoczek. The plan called for the creation of new communication routes, relieve the center, demolish the Chanajki district, create a housing estate and connect with it the unique green areas around the city with new tree plantings. The Second World War prevented the comprehensive implementation of this plan. In addition, in 1919 the city's territory was significantly expanded, incorporating the surrounding villages with plans of expanding the city.

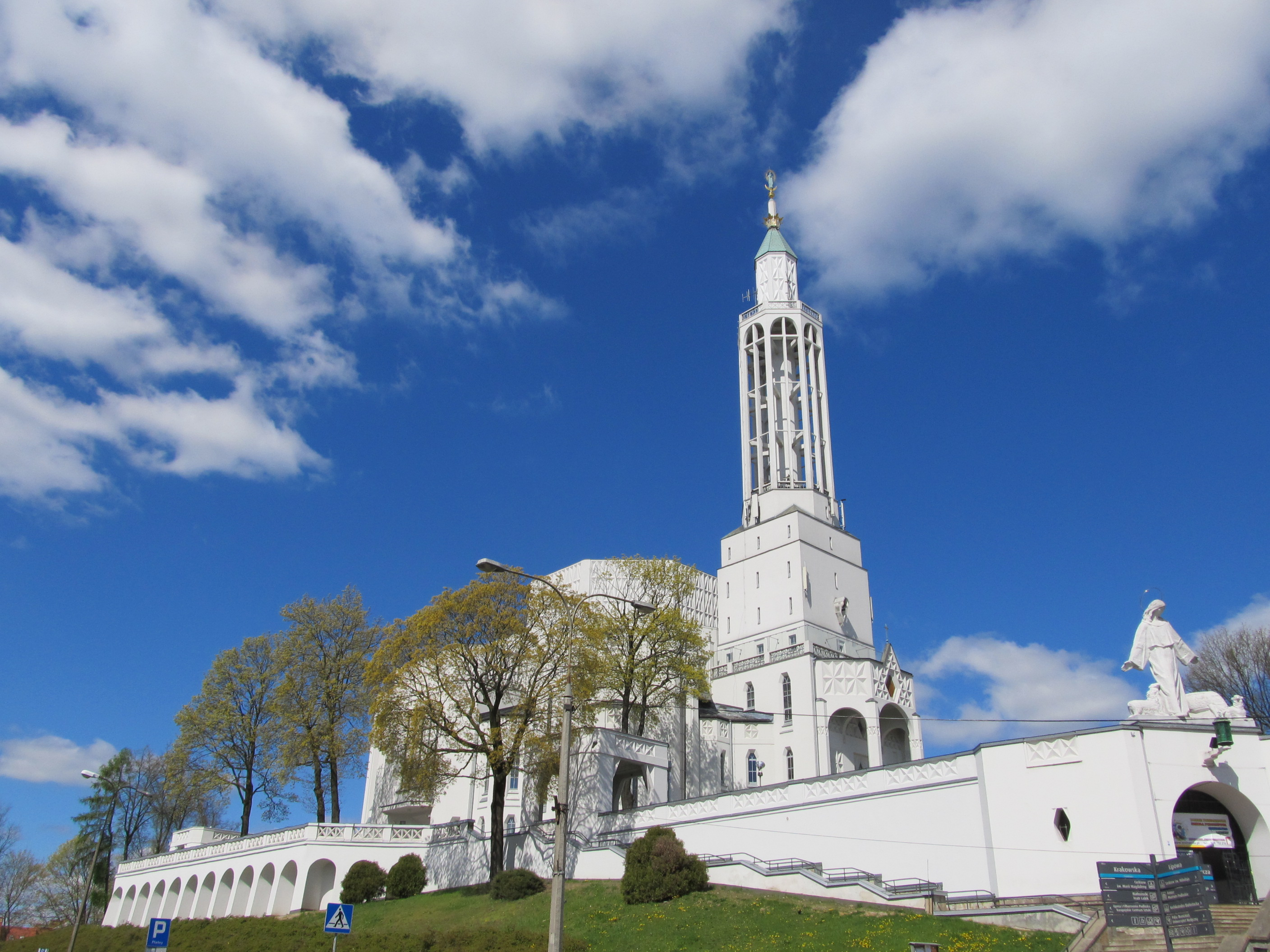
St. Roch's Church, 1920s and 1930s Modernist architecture

The center is dominated by buildings not exceeding 25 meters in height, and the outskirts of the city are mainly occupied by low-rise single-family houses. Taller buildings dominate in some residential districts such as the districts of Piasta I and II (located to the south of the city center), Dziesięciny I and II estates (located to the northwest of the city center) as well as Wysoki Stoczek and Słoneczny Stok. Dominants in Białystok are located mainly in the center and they are also there located two most important city icons: the St. Roch's Church and the Białystok Cathedral, which are on one axis. Each of the districts also has its dominant, which is usually a Catholic or an Orthodox church. The most important space in the city is Kościuszko Square - the main square in the shape of a triangle. The space is delimited by two axes, one is part of the axis along Lipowa Street connecting the two largest churches, and the other runs towards the west of the central district along Suraska Street and ends at Młynowa Street. An important spatial arrangement in Białystok is the Branicki Palace complex. The Baroque layout of the palace complex is symmetrically shaped according to one compositional axis with a coherent garden layout.

Throughout the years it expanded to include nearby villages: In the mid-eighteenth century Bojary which was located on the right bank of the Biala River was incorporated to it. On 10 May 1919, in accordance with the decision of the Sejm, Bialostoczek, Horodniany, Zwierzyniec-Letnisko, Starosielce, Słoboda (which was founded at the end of the 17th century, between the current Pogodna and Świerkowa Streets), Ogrodniki, Pieczurki, Wysoki Stoczek were incorporated also, as well as two mill villages Marczuk and Antoniuk. By the onset of World War II the city's territory amounted to 40 km^{2} (15 sq mi). The reconstruction of the city following the end of World War II and establishment of the People's Republic of Poland saw further expansion: the villages Bacieczki, Bacieczki Kolonia, Korycin and part of the village Klepacze, Krupniki, Fasty, Zaścianki and Zawady were incorporated into the city. The 70s saw another wave of expansion with the villages of Bagnówka, area of Zakłady Silikatowe, areas of state forests, Dojlidy Ponds and the orthodox cemetery at Dojlidy. At the onset of the millennium, in 2002, the village Zawady was included in the city's limits and at the last enlargement, in 2006, the villages Dojlidy Górne, Zagórki and Kolonia Halickie were incorporated and the city reached its current territory of 102 km^{2} (39 sq mi).

== Districts ==
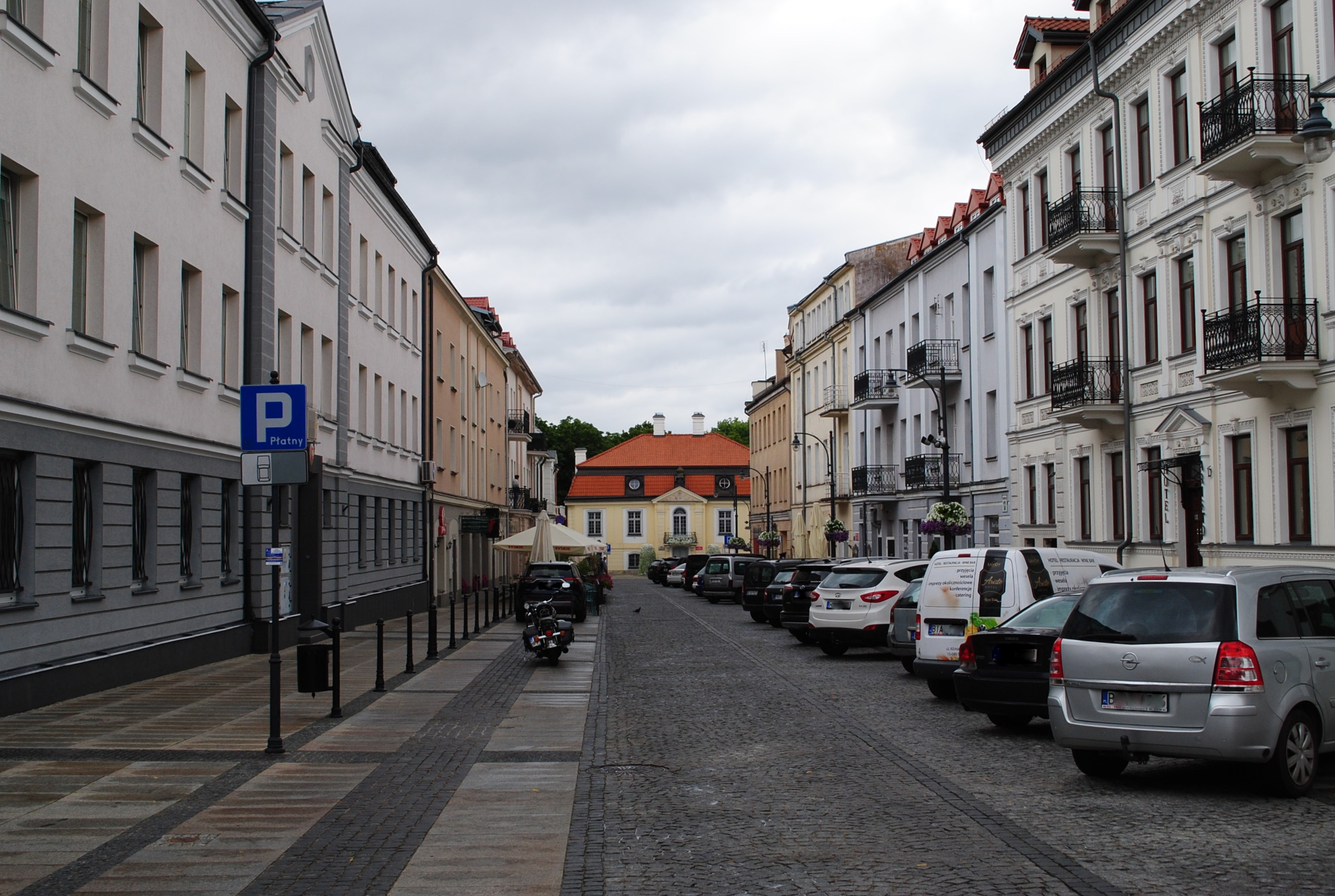
Kilińskiego Street, one of the historic streets in Centrum, the central district of Białystok

The city of Białystok is divided into 29 administrative units, known in Polish as osiedla. The first 27 of these were created on 25 October 2004. The 28th, Dojlidy Górne, was created by on 23 October 2006, out of three settlements which had been incorporated into the city: Dojlidy Górne, Kolonia Halickie, and Zagórki. A new district called Bagnówka was created at the beginning of 2021.

The center of the city, Osiedle Centrum, surrounds Lipowa Street, the main street of the city. Lipowa Street extends from Rynek Kościuszki (the corner of Spółdzielcza Street) to Plac Niepodległości im. Romana Dmowskiego (the corner of Krakowska Street). Over the centuries the name of this street has taken on a number of different names; Choroska, Nowolipie, Lipowa, Józef Piłsudski, Joseph Stalin, Adolf Hitler and Joseph Stalin, once again, to return, after the end of World War II, to its original name – Lipowa Street.

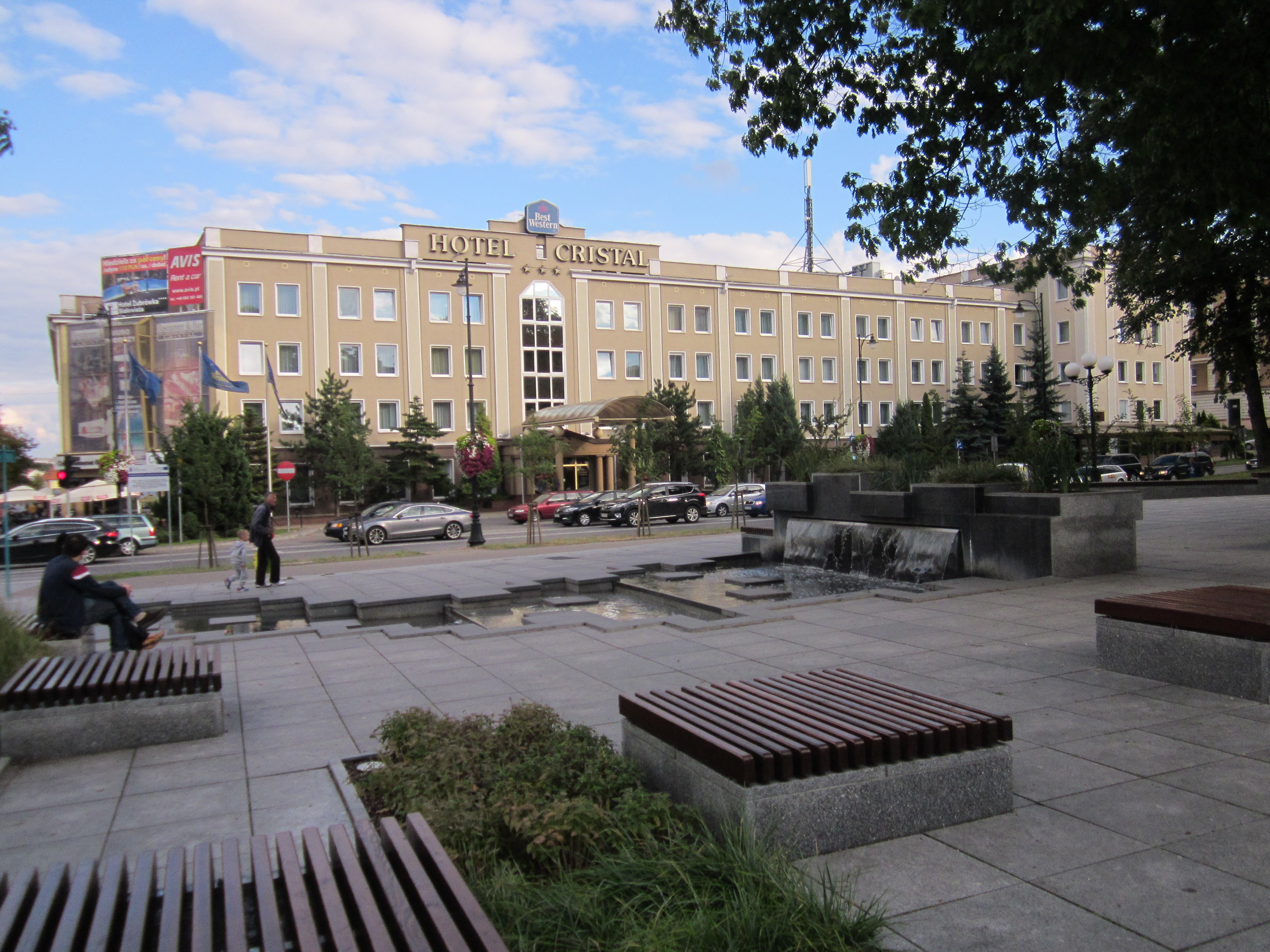
A public square dedicated to Constantine the Great

The city covers 10,213 ha (25,240 acres) of which 3,210 ha (7,900 acres) is agricultural land, 4,889 ha (12,080 acres) is urbanized areas, 85 ha (210 acres) is surface waters and 65 ha (160 acres) is wasteland. The composition of the districts vary from residential near the city center, with a combination of multi-story apartment buildings and individual houses on small parcels, to industrial and agricultural at the city edges.

== Metropolitan Białystok ==
Metropolitan Białystok was designated by the Voivodeship of the Regulation No. 52/05 of 16 May 2005 to help develop the region economically. In 2006, the metropolitan area population was 450,254 inhabitants. The municipalities adjacent to Białystok are slowly losing their agricultural character, becoming residential suburban neighborhoods with single-family housing and small businesses.

== Demographics ==
Historical population
| Year | Pop. | ±% |
|---|---|---|
| 1931 | 91,101 | — |
| 1950 | 68,503 | −24.8% |
| 1960 | 120,921 | +76.5% |
| 1970 | 168,500 | +39.3% |
| 1978 | 211,178 | +25.3% |
| 1988 | 263,884 | +25.0% |
| 2002 | 291,383 | +10.4% |
| 2011 | 294,001 | +0.9% |
| 2021 | 294,242 | +0.1% |

In June 2020, the population of the city was 296,958. Among the cities of Poland, Białystok is second in terms of population density, tenth in population, and thirteenth in area. Historically, Białystok has been a destination for internal and foreign immigration, especially from Central and Eastern Europe. In addition to the Polish minority, there was formerly a Jewish majority in Białystok. The Jewish share in the population of Białystok grew from 22.4% (761) in 1765 to 66.6% (6,000) in 1808 and 76% (47,783) in 1895. According to the Russian census of 1897, out of the total population of 66,000, Jews constituted 41,900 (around 63% percent). According to the German census of 1916, Jews comprised about 72% of the inhabitants (no less than 40,000). The demographic situation changed due to the influx of Polish repatriants, intelligentsia and civil servants, and the enlargement of the city after the World War I. According to the 1931 census, the population of Białystok totalled 91,101: 45.5% (41,493) Roman Catholics, 43% (39,165) Jews (by religion), and 8.2% (7,502) Eastern Orthodox believers.

In 1936, Białystok had a population of 99,722, of whom: 50.9% (50,758) were Poles, 42.6% (42,482) Jews, 2.1% (2,094) Germans and 0.4% (359) Russians; 46.6% (45,474) adhered to the Catholic religion, 43% (42,880) to Judaism, 8.2% (8,177) to Eastern Orthodoxy and 2.9% (2,892) to Evangelicalism. World War II changed all of this: in 1939, around 107,000 people lived in Białystok, but by 1946, the population had dropped to 56,759, with much less ethnic diversity than it had had previously, due primarily to the murder of its large Jewish population. Currently the city's population is 97% Polish, 2.5% Belarusian and 0.5% of a number of minorities including Russians, Lithuanians, and Ukrainians. Most of the modern-day population growth is based on internal migration within Poland and urbanization of surrounding areas.

== Politics ==
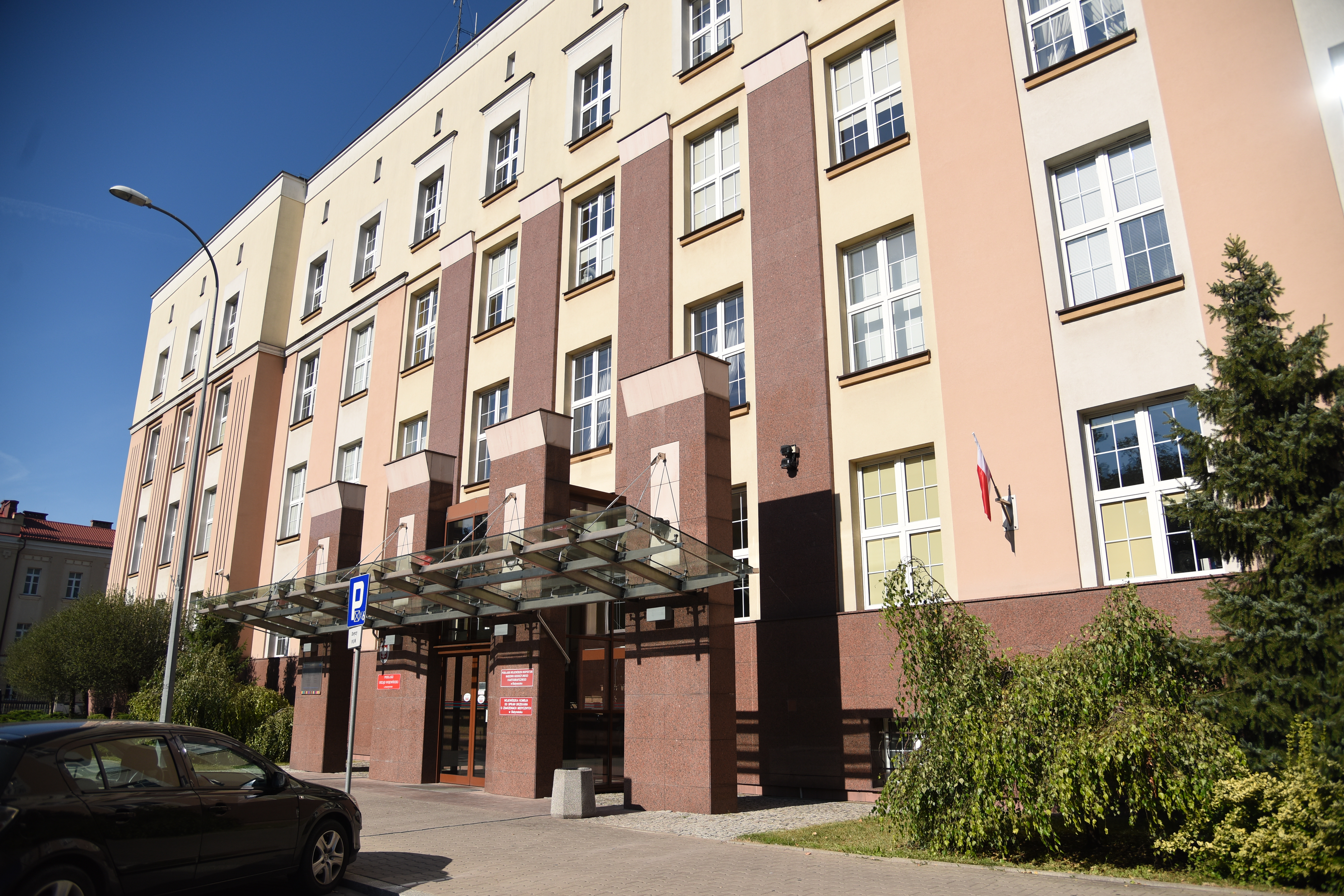
Podlaskie Voivodeship Office at Mickiewicza Street

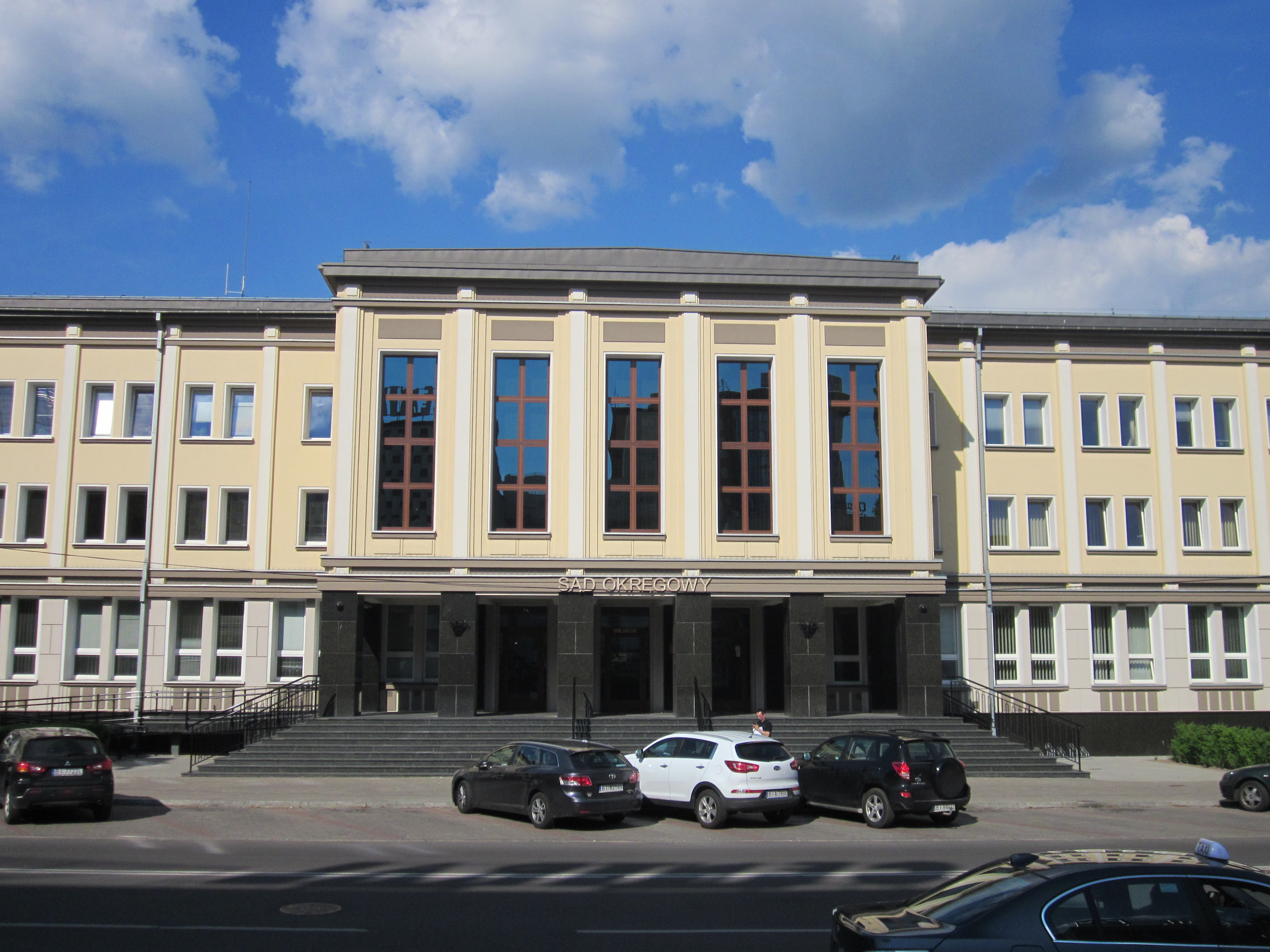
Regional Court in Białystok

=== City government ===
Białystok, like other major cities in Poland, is a city county (Polish: Miasto na prawach powiatu). The Legislative power in the city is vested in the unicameral Białystok City Council (Polish: Rada Miasta), which has 28 members. Council members are elected directly every four years, one of whom is the mayor, or President of Białystok (Polish: prezydent). Like most legislative bodies, the City Council divides itself into committees which have the oversight of various functions of the city government. Bills passed by a simple majority are sent to the mayor, who may sign them into law. If the mayor vetoes a bill, the Council has 30 days to override the veto by a two-thirds majority vote. The current President of Białystok, elected for his first term in 2006, is Tadeusz Truskolaski won the elections as the Civic Platform's candidate, however, he has no official connection with the party. In the first round of the elections he received 49% of the votes (42,889 votes altogether). In the later runoff he defeated his rival candidate Marek Kozlowski from Law and Justice (Polish: Prawo i Sprawiedliwość), receiving 67% of the votes cast (53,018 votes).

For the 2010–2011 fiscal year the city received revenue (taxes levied + investments) of 1,409,565,525 zł, expended 1,676,459,102 zł leaving a budget deficit of 266,893,577 zł. The deficit was covered by short-term borrowing of 166,893,577 zł and the issuance of 100 million zł in municipal bonds.

Other levels of governmental representation
It is also the seat of government for the Podlaskie Voivodeship. The city is represented by several members of both houses of the Polish Parliament (Sejm and Senat) from the Białystok constituency. Białystok is represented by the Podlaskie and Warmian-Masurian constituency of the European Parliament.

=== International relations ===
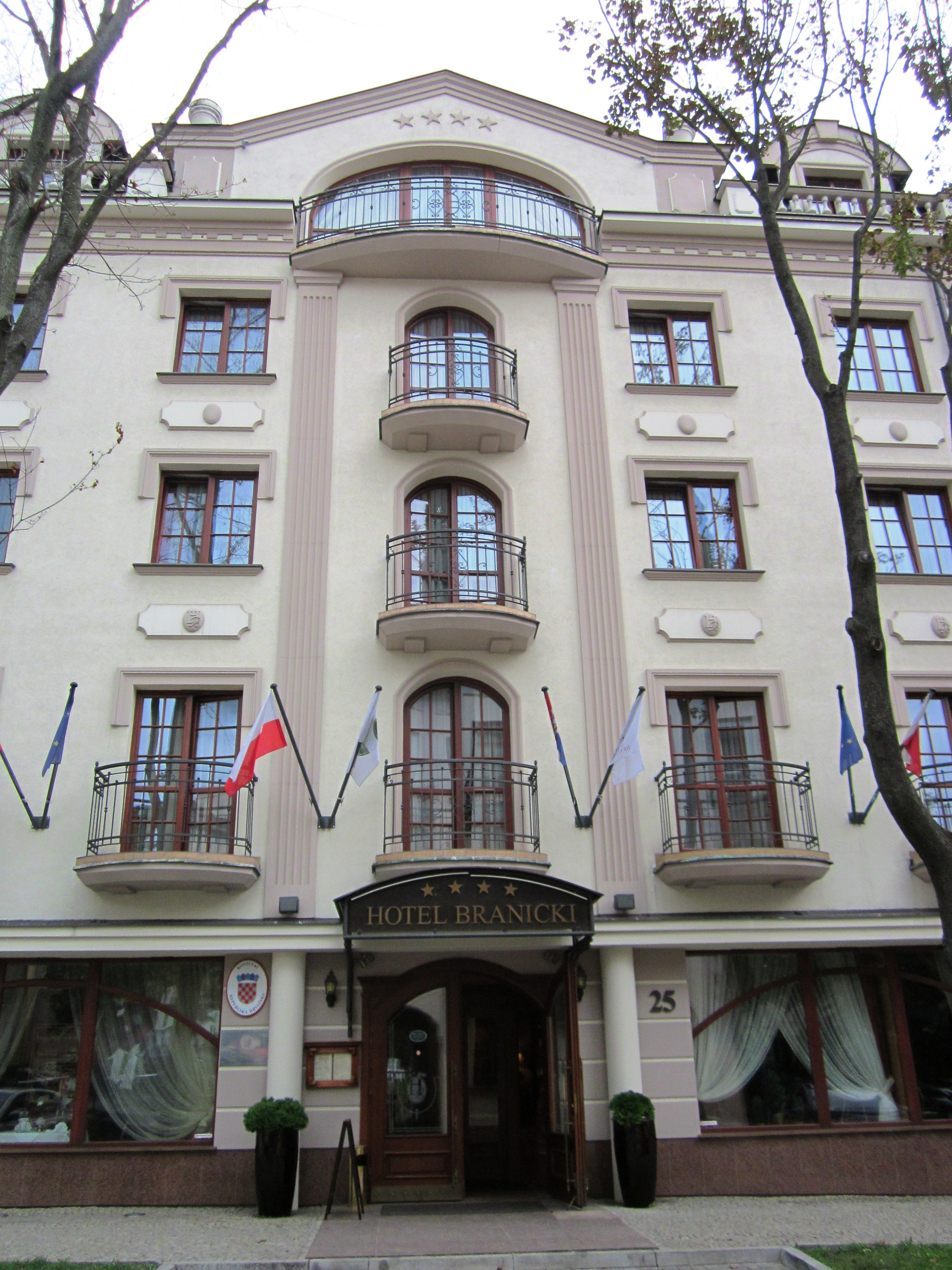
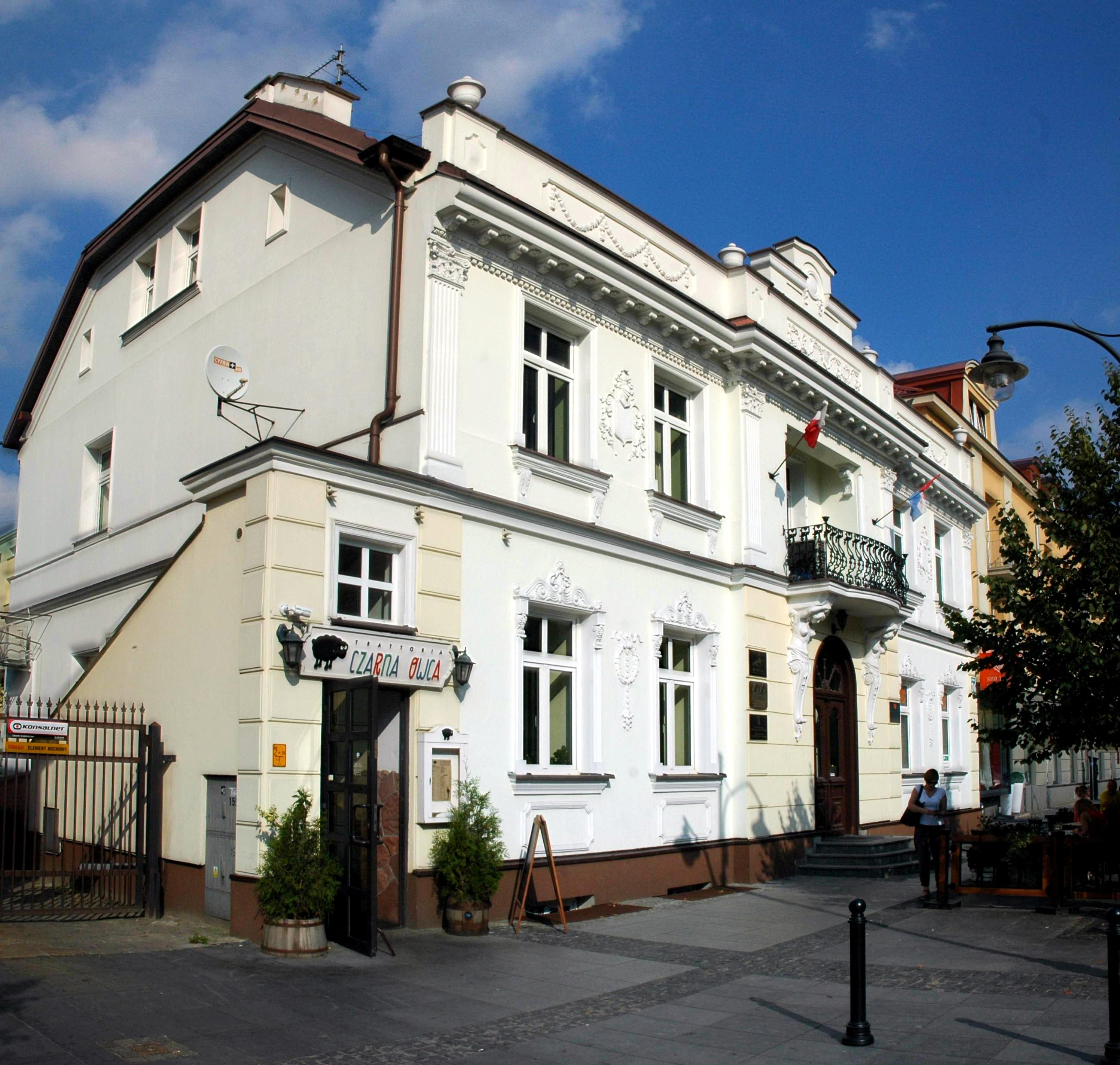
Honorary consulates of Croatia and Luxembourg

There are thirteen consulates in Białystok, a Consulate General of Belarus and Honorary Consulates of Romania, Finland, Bosnia and Herzegovina, Bulgaria, Croatia, Estonia, Kazakhstan, Latvia, Lithuania, Luxembourg, Malta and Serbia. The City of Białystok is a member of several organizations such as Union of Polish Metropolises (Polish: Unia Metropolii Polskich), Euroregion Niemen, Polish Green Lungs Foundation, and Eurocities.

Białystok is twinned with:

- Bahir Dar, Ethiopia
- Bochum, Germany
- Bornova, Turkey
- Chongzuo, China
- Dijon, France
- Dobrich, Bulgaria
- Eindhoven, Netherlands
- Jelgava, Latvia
- Kaunas, Lithuania
- Lusaka, Zambia
- Mazara del Vallo, Italy
- Milwaukee, United States
- Saint-Louis, Senegal
- Sliema, Malta
- Urgench, Uzbekistan
- Yehud, Israel

Former twin towns:

- Irkutsk, Russia
- Kaliningrad, Russia
- Pskov, Russia
- Tomsk, Russia

On 3 March 2022, Białystok ended its partnership with the Russian cities of Irkutsk, Kaliningrad, Pskov and Tomsk, and also with the Belarusian city of Grodno as a reaction to the 2022 Russian invasion of Ukraine.

Eastern Partnership cities:

- Lutsk, Ukraine
- (Georgia (country)) Gori, Georgia
- Bălți, Moldova
- Gyumri, Armenia
- Sumgait, Azerbaijan

Former partnership:

- Grodno, Belarus

The village of Belostok (Polish: Białystok) in Russia, founded by Polish settlers, is named after the city.

== Military garrison ==
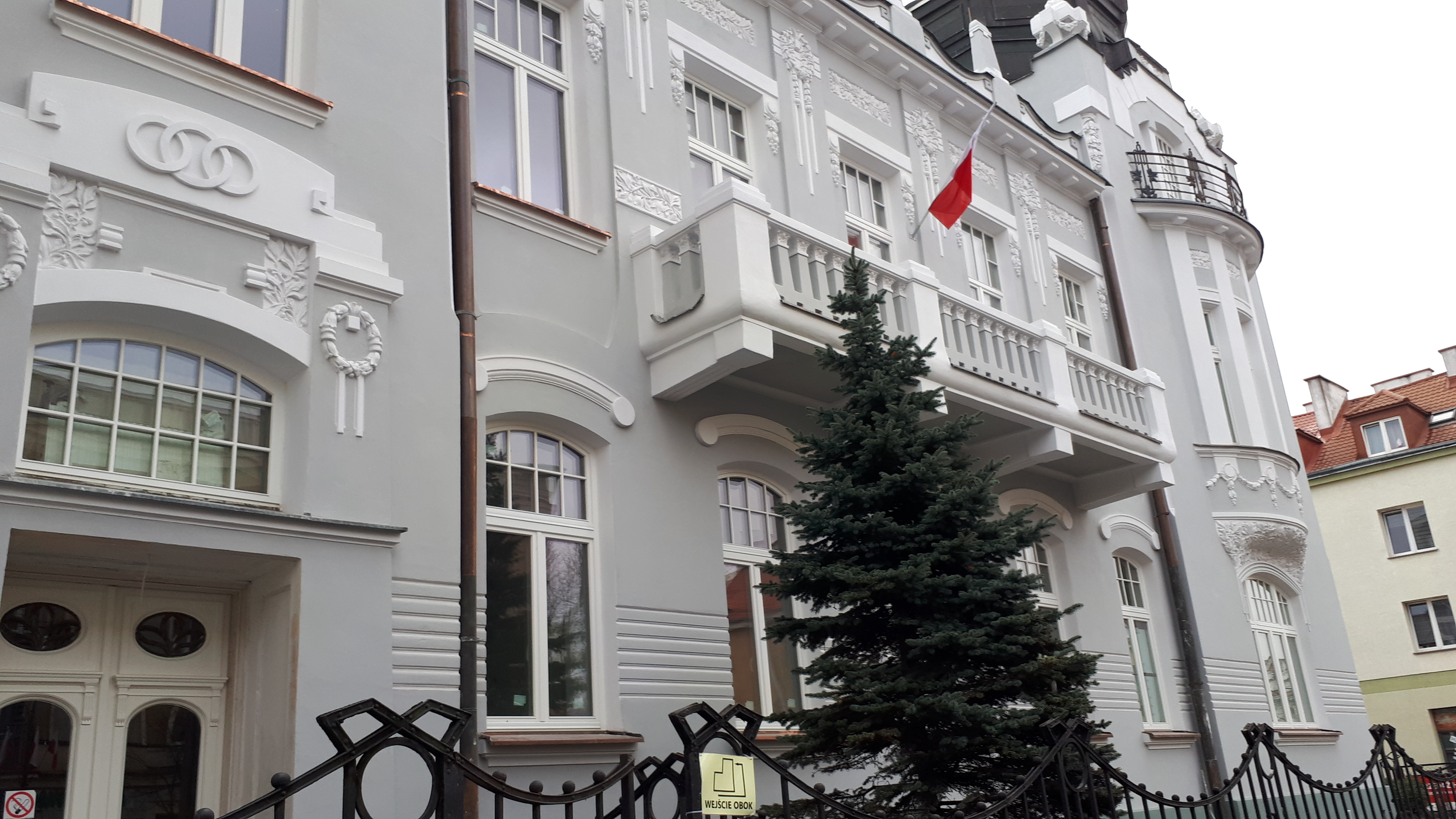
Military Drafting Office located in the historical Nowik Palace

The construction of the Saint Petersburg–Warsaw Railway which passed through the city and was the strategic nerve of the Russian Empire, resulted in the rising of the military importance of the city: In 1879, construction of the barracks of the Włodzimierski Infantry Regiment began (currently it is the area of the Voivodeship hospital between Wojskowa, Skłodowskiej-Curie and Wołodyjowskiego Streets). In 1884, barracks of the Kazan Infantry Regiment were established at Traugutta Street in Wygoda. In 1887, barracks of the Mariampole Dragon Regiment were erected at 100 Bema Street. In 1890, the barracks of the 4th Kharkov Uhlan Regiment were built at Kawaleryjska Street.

Throughout the interwar period and the existence of the Second Polish Republic, the city enjoyed the presence of the 42nd Infantry Regiment (barracks at Wygoda), 10th Lithuanian Uhlan Regiment (Kawaleryjska Street) and the 14th Horse Artillery Divizion (Bema Street), the command of the Podlaska Cavalry Brigade and spare center (Skłodowskiej-Curie street, then Piwna), units of the Armed Forces of the Second Polish Republic.

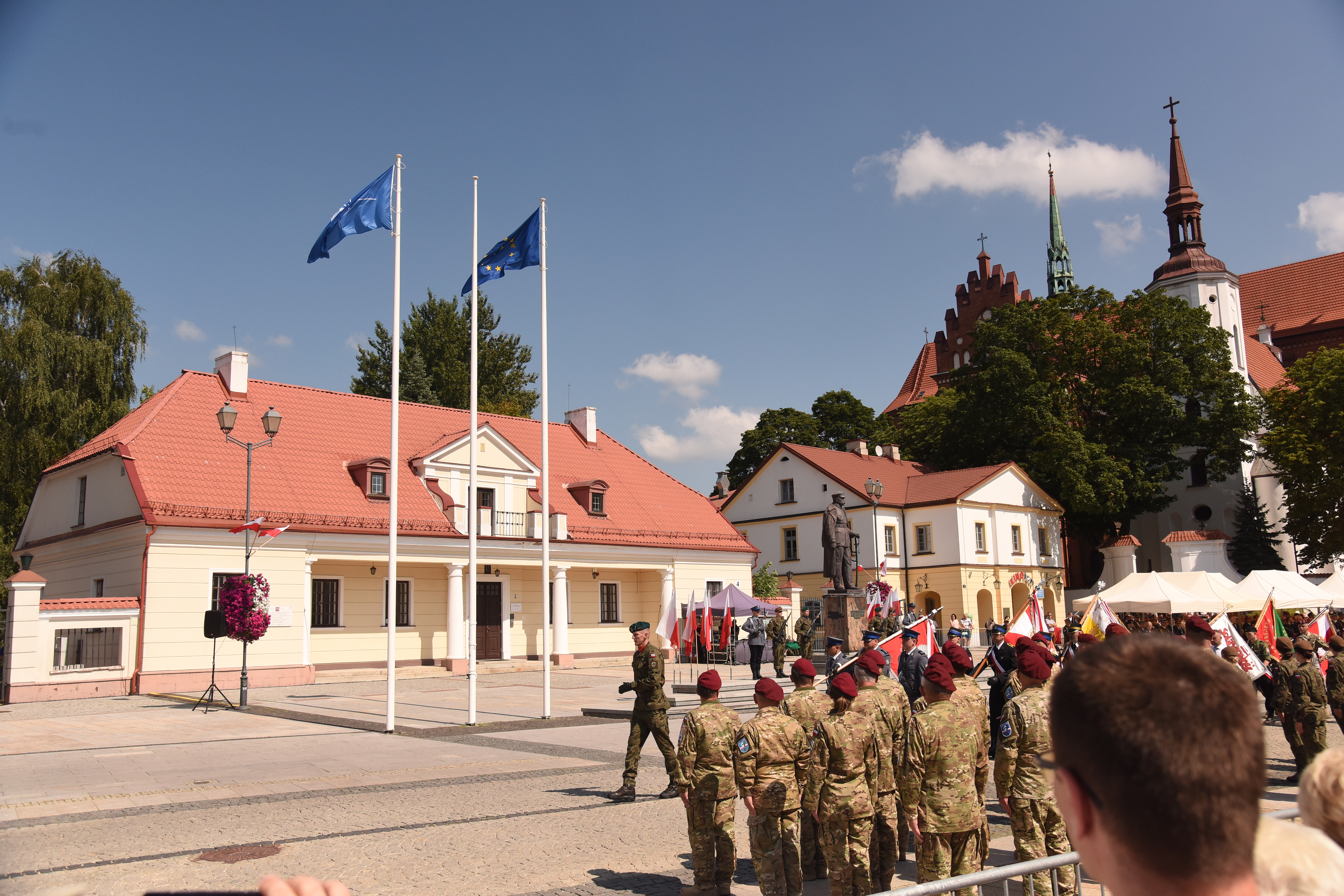
Polish Armed Forces Day celebration at Kościuszko Market Square in 2022

During December 1993 an order of the Chief of the General Staff of the Polish Armed Forces created the 18th Mechanized Brigade (Polish: 18 Brygada Zmechanizowana) at the garrison in Białystok. The unit was formed from the 3rd Mechanized Regiment (Polish: 3 Pułk Zmechanizowany) and was subordinated to the commander of the 1st Warsaw Mechanised Division (Polish: 1 Warszawskiej Dywizji Zmechanizowanej im. Tadeusza Kościuszki). On 31 December 2001, as a result of the restructuring of the Polish Armed Forces, the 18th Mechanized Brigade was disbanded and in its place was created the 18th Territorial Defense Battalion. 31 December 2001, as a result of the restructuring of the Armed Forces, 18th Mechanized Brigade (Polish: 18 Brygada Zmechanizowana) was disbanded and in its place created the 18th Territorial Defense Battalion (Polish: 18 Białostocka Brygada Obrony Terytorialnej)., itself reorganized into the 18th Reconnaissance Regiment (Polish: 18 Pułk Rozpoznawczy) of the Polish Land Forces is based in Białystok.

The Cavalry Brigade "Białystok" (BK "Białystok") of the Polish Army of the Second Republic was formed in February 1929. On 1 April 1937, BK "Białystok" was renamed the Podlaska Cavalry Brigade (Polish: Podlaska Brygada Kawalerii). Its headquarters was located in Białystok and operated as part of Independent Operational Group Narew. It was formed from the Cavalry Brigade "Białystok", which existed between February 1929, and 30 March 1937. After the Soviet invasion of Poland, remnants of the Brigade fought both Wehrmacht and Red Army troops, capitulating on 6 October 1939.

== Economy ==
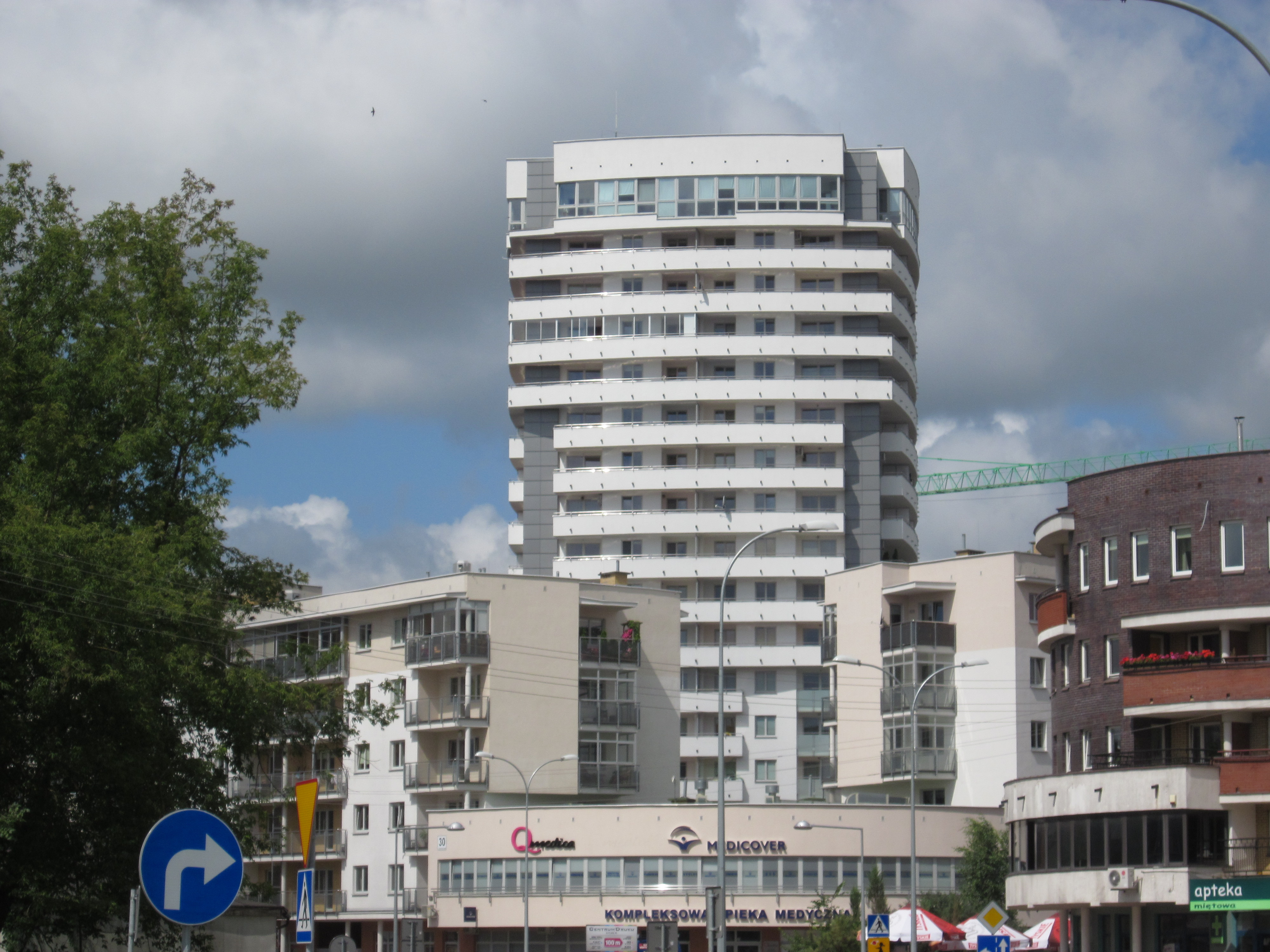
High-rise building in the city center

In the nineteenth century, Białystok was an important center for light industry, which was the reason for the substantial growth of the city's population. The tradition continued with many garment factories established in the twentieth century, such as Fasty in the district of Bacieczki. However, after the fall of communism in 1989 many of these factories faced severe problems and subsequently closed down.

The unemployment rate for November 2020 in Białystok was 6.8%. The 2009 average household had a monthly per capita income of 1018.77 zł and monthly per capita expenses of 823.56 zł

The city has a number of nearby border crossings. The border with Belarus is only 50 km (31 mi) away, the nearest border crossings are located in; Bobrowniki (road crossing located about 50 km (31 mi) from the city limits), Kuźnica Białostocka (road and rail crossing located 60 km (37 mi) from the city limits), Siemianówka (railway – freight traffic), Połowce (road) and Czeremcha (railway). Since the border with Belarus is also the eastern border of the European Union, as well as the Schengen Area the city is a center for trade in mainly from the east.

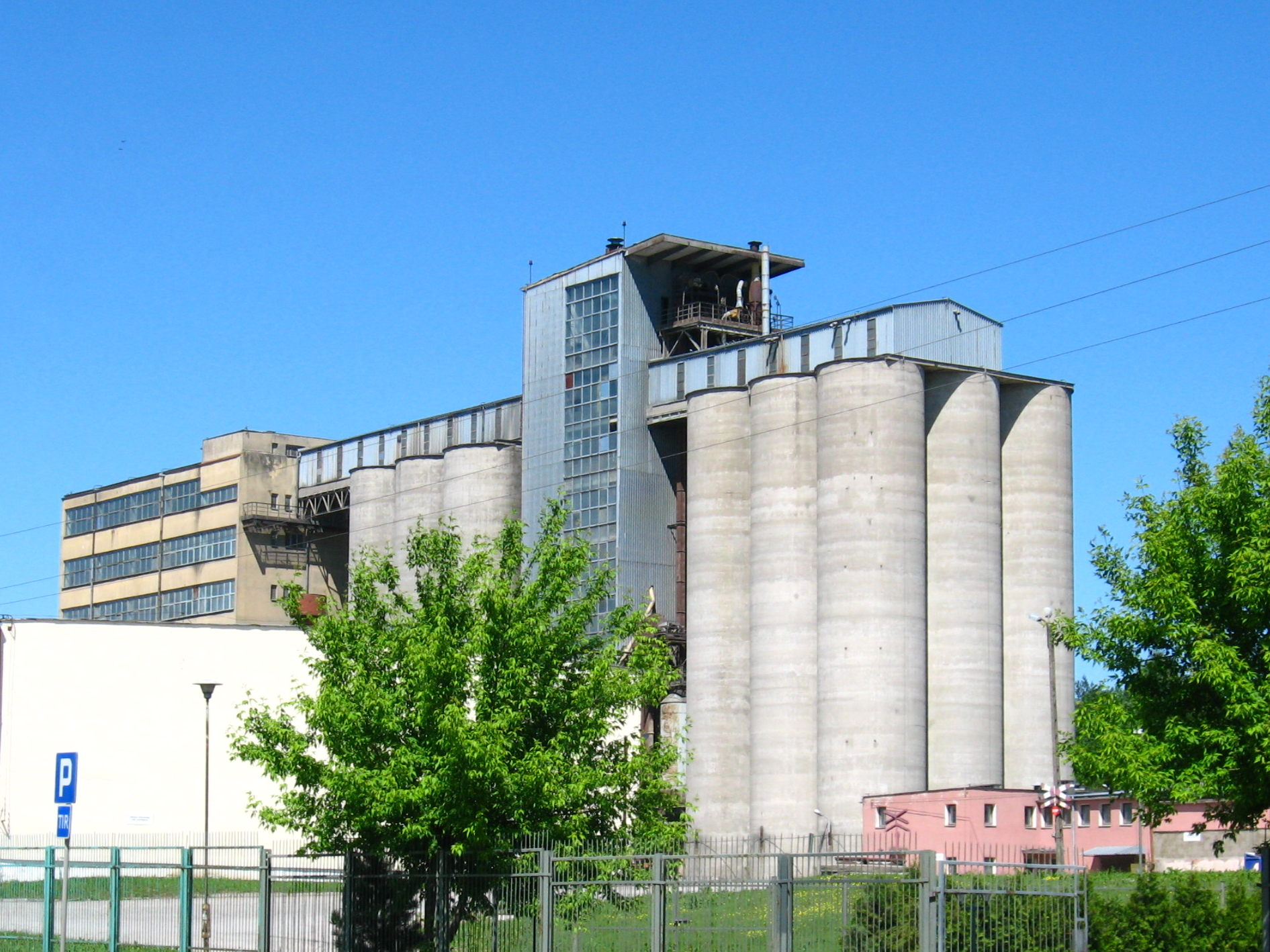
Silos of Podlaskie Zakłady Zbożowe (Podlaskie Cereal Industrial Plants)

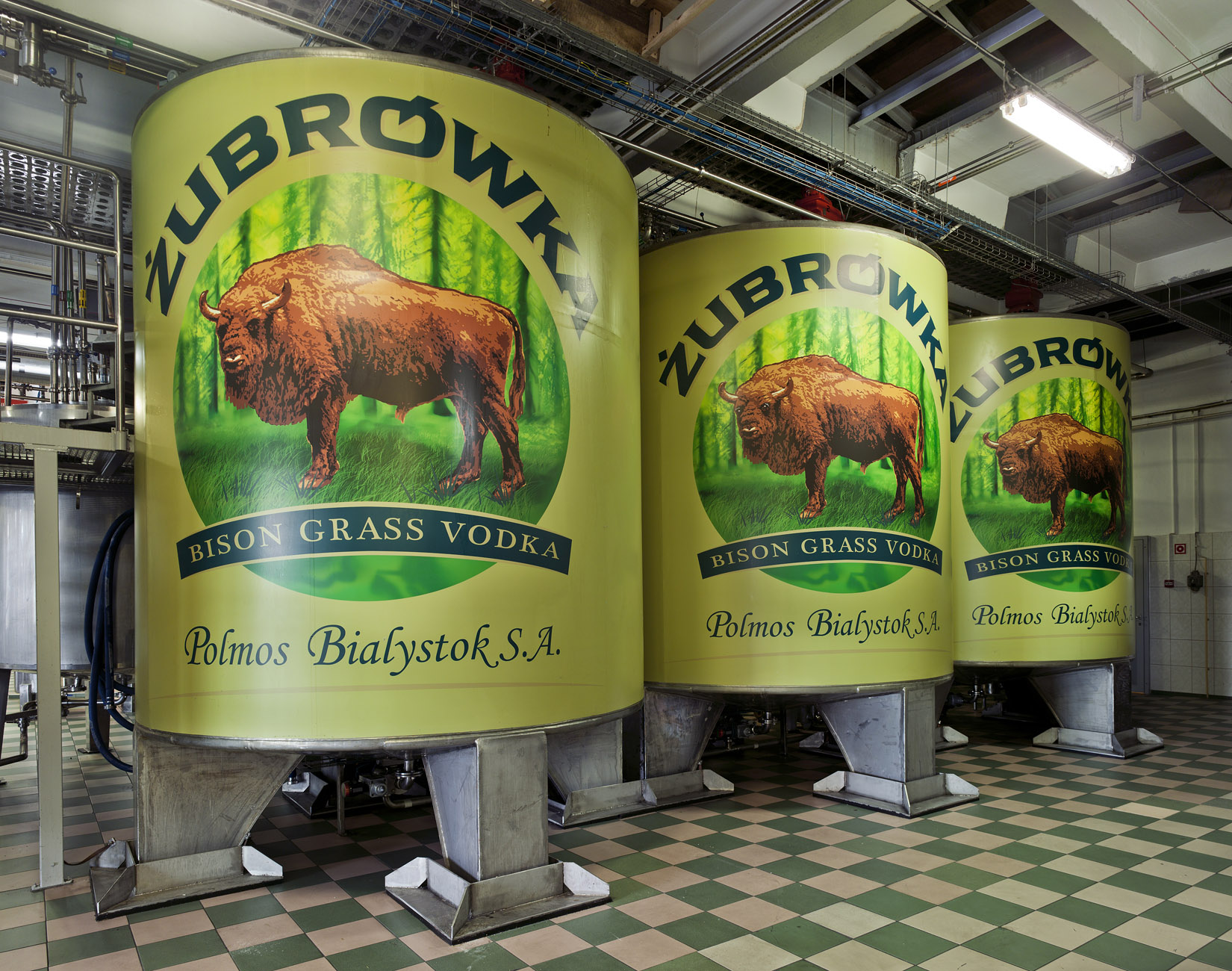
The bison grass vodka called "Żubrówka" is made in Białystok at the Polmos Factory

The leading industries in the city's economy are food processing (production of meat products, fruit and vegetable products, the production of spirits, the production of frozen food, grain processing), electrical engineering (production tools and equipment for machine tools, production of electric heaters, manufacture and production mixers household appliances). There is also a developed machine industry (electronics, machinery and metal), plastic processing (production of household appliances), textiles (textiles and upholstery, manufacture of underwear, clothing accessories, footwear and backpacks), Wood (production plywood and furniture) building materials.

Some major employers who are based in Białystok include:

- Dojlidy Brewery in the district of Dojlidy produces the second most popular beer in Poland, Żubr.
- Polmos Białystok, the biggest vodka manufacturer in Poland, is located in the city district of Starosielce. The company produces Absolwent and Żubrówka (bison grass vodka) – both major exports abroad.
- Standard Motor Products Poland Ltd. headquartered in Białystok began manufacturing ignition coils for original equipment manufacturers 30 years ago.
- "Supon" Białystok is the leading Polish producer of fire fighting equipment.
- SavaPol, Sp.z o.o. is a manufacturer of stationary and mobile concrete mixing equipment based in Białystok.
- Biazet S.A. is a large manufacture of household appliances, including vacuum cleaners, coffee makers, and LED lighting located in Białystok.
- Agnella, a major Polish producer of carpets and similar products is in Białystok, located in the district of Białostoczek.
- Rosti Poland Sp. z o.o., has provided for more than 60 years precision injection molded products for some of the world's leading brands.
- Biaglass Huta Szkla Białystok Sp. z o.o., established in 1929, produces mouth blown glass lampshades and related products. Biaglass belongs to elite group of Glass Works in Europe, where 100% of the lighting glass is mouth-blown.
- Chłodnia Białystok S.A (Cold Store Białystok S.A.), established in 1952, is one of the largest Polish producers of frozen vegetables, fruits and ready-to-heat meals.
- Podlaskie Zakłady Zbożowe S.A. was established on 1 July 2000 as a result of privatizing The Regional Establishment of Corn and Milling Industry 'PZZ' in Białystok. It is one of the leading firms in Podlaskie Voivodeship in the department of preservation and processing of grain with elevators in Białystok, Grajewo and Suwałki.

=== Innovations ===
In order to increase the attractiveness of the city of Białystok for investments based on modern technologies, the Białystok Science and Technology Park was opened in 2014, which is to initiate the development of infrastructure conducive to increasing innovation among local and regional enterprises.

Amongst companies based in the Park are the Institute of Innovative Technologies EMAG, the Department of Prevention of Metabolic Diseases Institute of Animal Reproduction and Food Research of the Polish Academy of Sciences, and a biometric photographs company PhotoAid.

== Public utilities ==
Water supply is provided by Wodociągi Białostockie, the municipal water company. In 2015, the length of the active water supply network in Białystok was 540.7 km (336 mi). Compared to 2010, this length increased by 72.6 km (45 mi), and compared to the previous year by 13.3 km (8 mi). At the end of 2015, there were 20,508 residential buildings in the city connected to the water supply system. In the years 2010 - 2015, this number was constantly increasing. For comparison, at the end of 2010, there were 18,654 residential buildings connected to the water supply network, 19,307 at the end of 2012, and 20,171 at the end of 2014. Electricity in the city is supplied by PGE Polska Grupa Energetyczna (formerly Zakład Energetyczny Białystok). Apartment buildings in the city are connected to the municipal heating system which was operated until its privatization by the Heating Energy Municipal Enterprise (Polish: Miejskie Przedsiębiorstwo Energetyki Cieplnej). From November 2017 following its privatization, it was renamed Enea Ciepło, being a subsidiary of the energy conglomerate Enea SA. The energy for the municipal heating is produced by the Białystok Power Station using cogeneration. Gas in the city is provided by PGNiG. In November 1947, following the end of World War II, a decision was approved to construct in the city gas system, yet the city was finally connected to the gas system in 1962. Waste collection in the city is done by MPO Białystok, the municipal-owned cleaning enterprise as well as by other companies which are handling waste collection in some of the city districts, such as Koma. Collected waste is processed since 2015 at the Municipal Waste Treatment Plant (Polish: Zakład Unieszkodliwiania Odpadów Komunalnych) located at 40F Generała Władysława Andersa Street, replacing the landfill in Hryniewicze.

== Culture and tourism ==
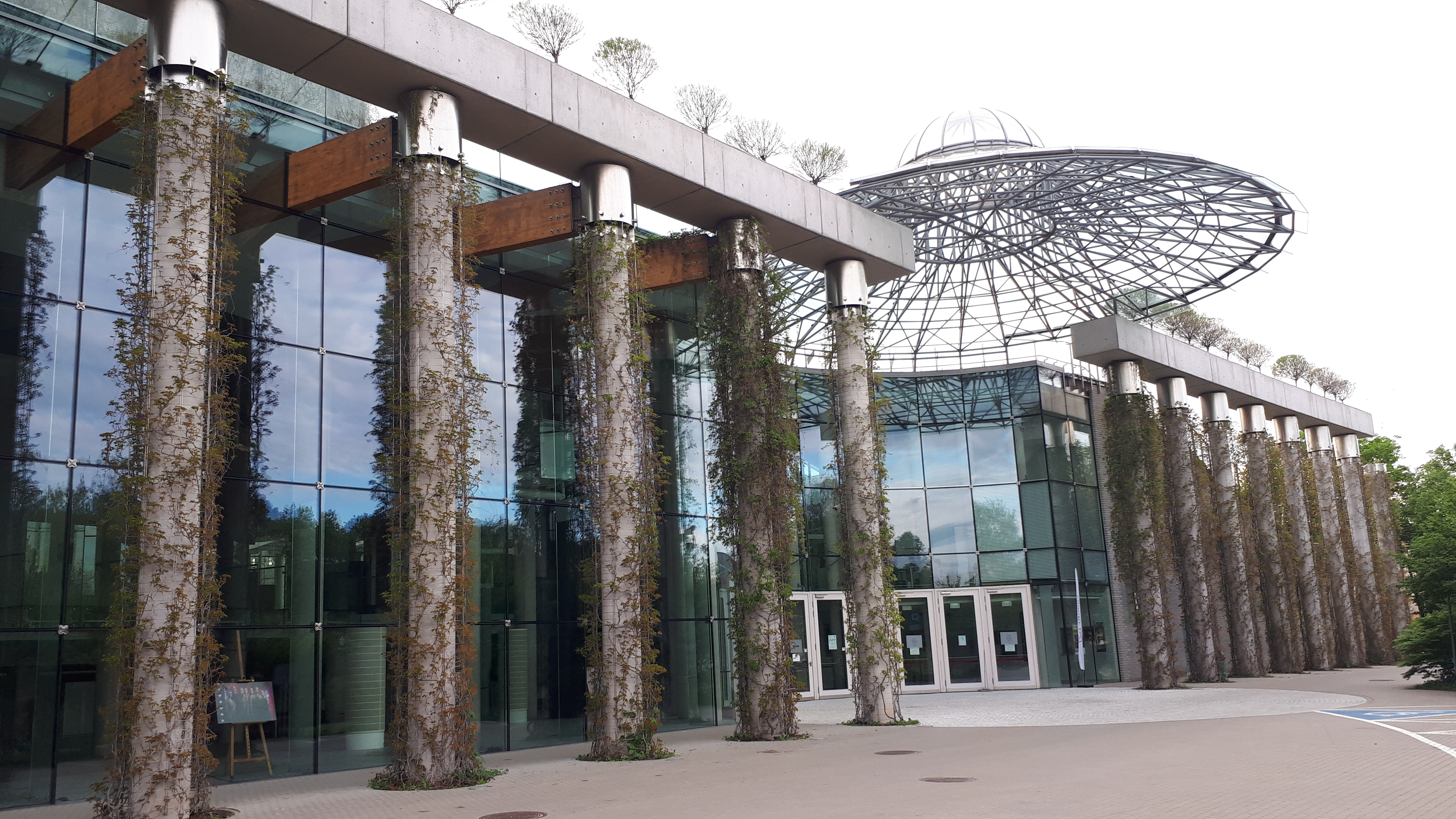
Opera and Philharmonic

Białystok is one of the largest cultural centers in the Podlaskie Voivodeship. The attractions include performing arts groups, art museums, historical museums, walking tours of architectural/cultural aspects and a wide variety of parks and green spaces. Białystok in 2010 was on the short-list, but ultimately lost the competition, to become a finalist for European Capital of Culture in 2016.

=== Performing arts ===
The city has a number of performing arts facilities including:

The Białystok Puppet Theatre (Polish: Bialostocki Teatr Lalek), established in 1953, is one of the oldest Polish puppet theaters. The facility is located at Kalinowskiego 1 in Białystok. The repertoire includes performances for both children and puppet adaptations of world literature for adults. Because of the high artistic level of productions, the theater has been recognized as one of the best puppetry arts centers in Poland.

The Aleksandra Węgierki Drama Theatre, housed in a building designed by Jarosław Girina, was built in the years 1933–1938.

The Podlaskie Opera and Philharmonic – European Art Centre in Białystok is the largest institute of arts in Northeastern Poland and the most modern cultural center in this region of Europe. In its amphitheatre every year at the end of June Halfway Festival takes place.

=== Museums ===
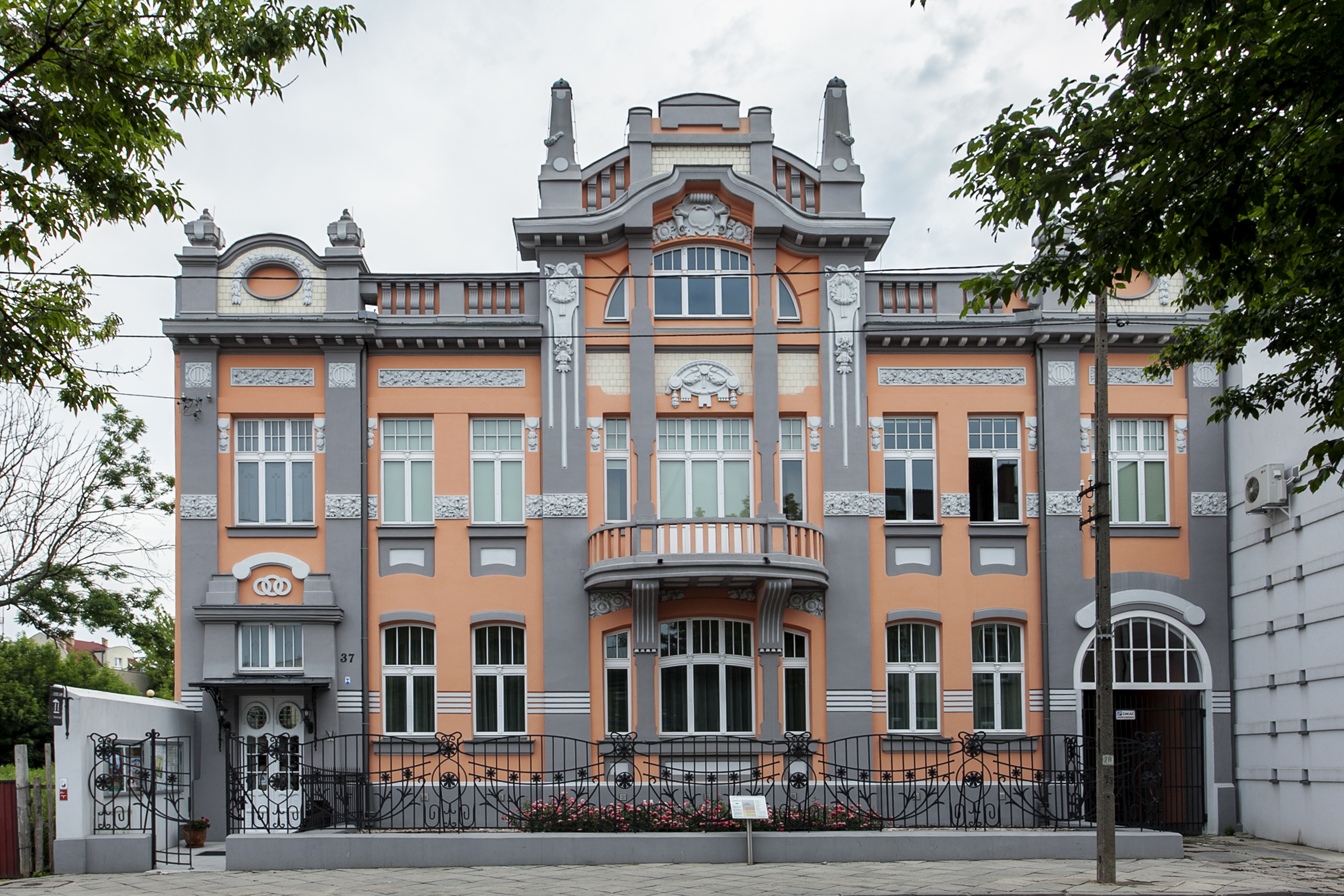
Historical Museum

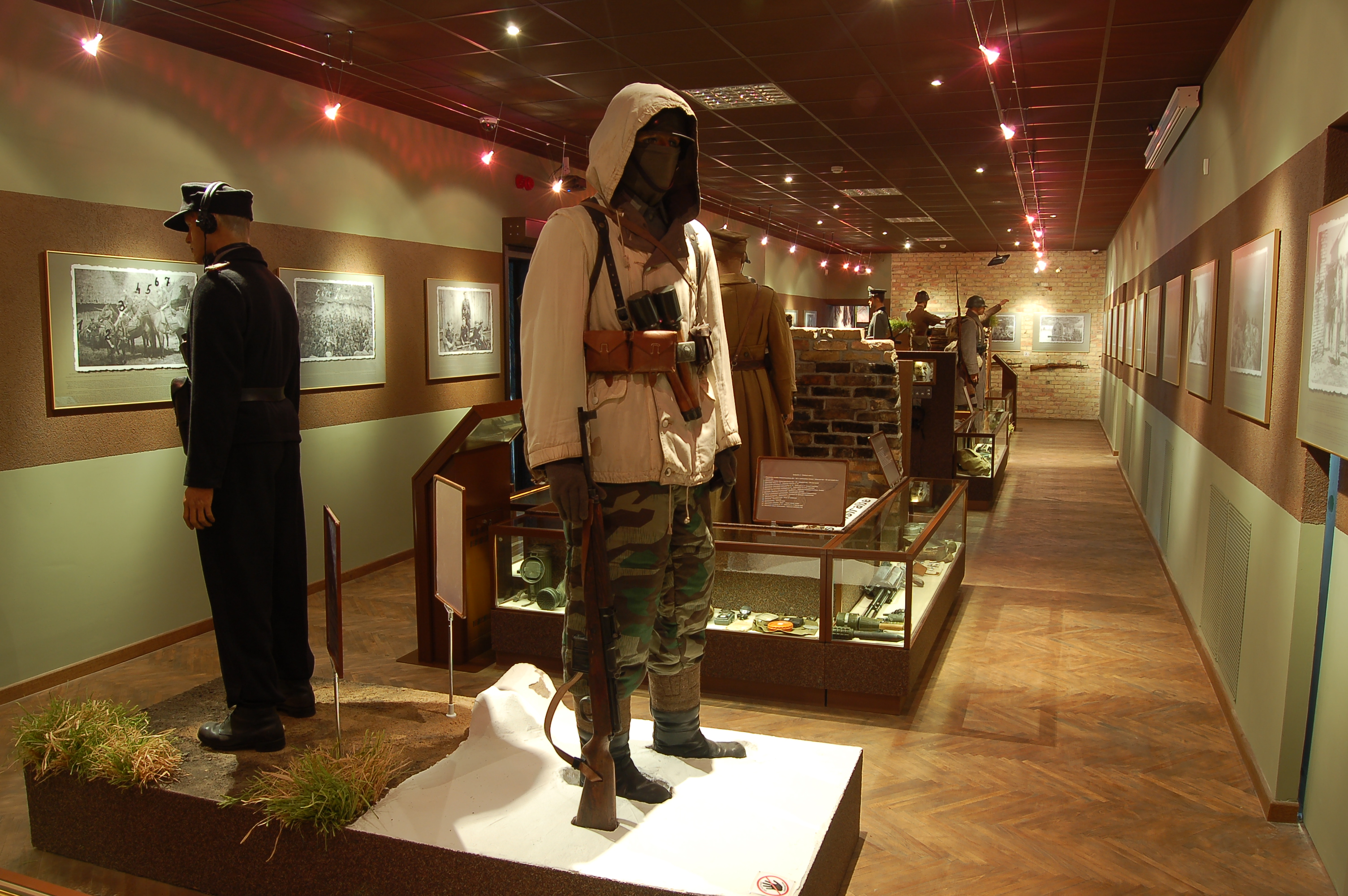
Army Museum

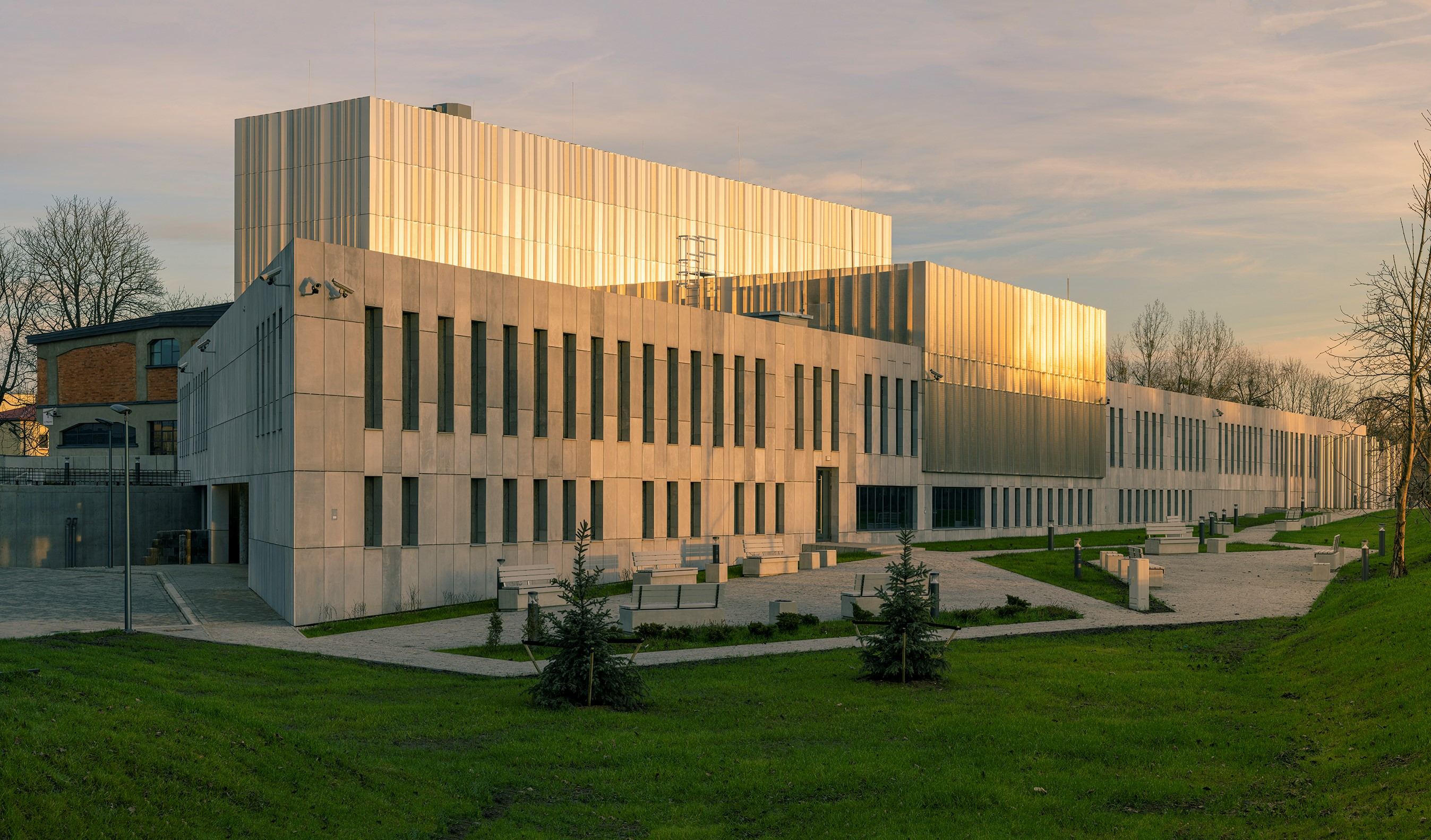
Sybir Memorial Museum

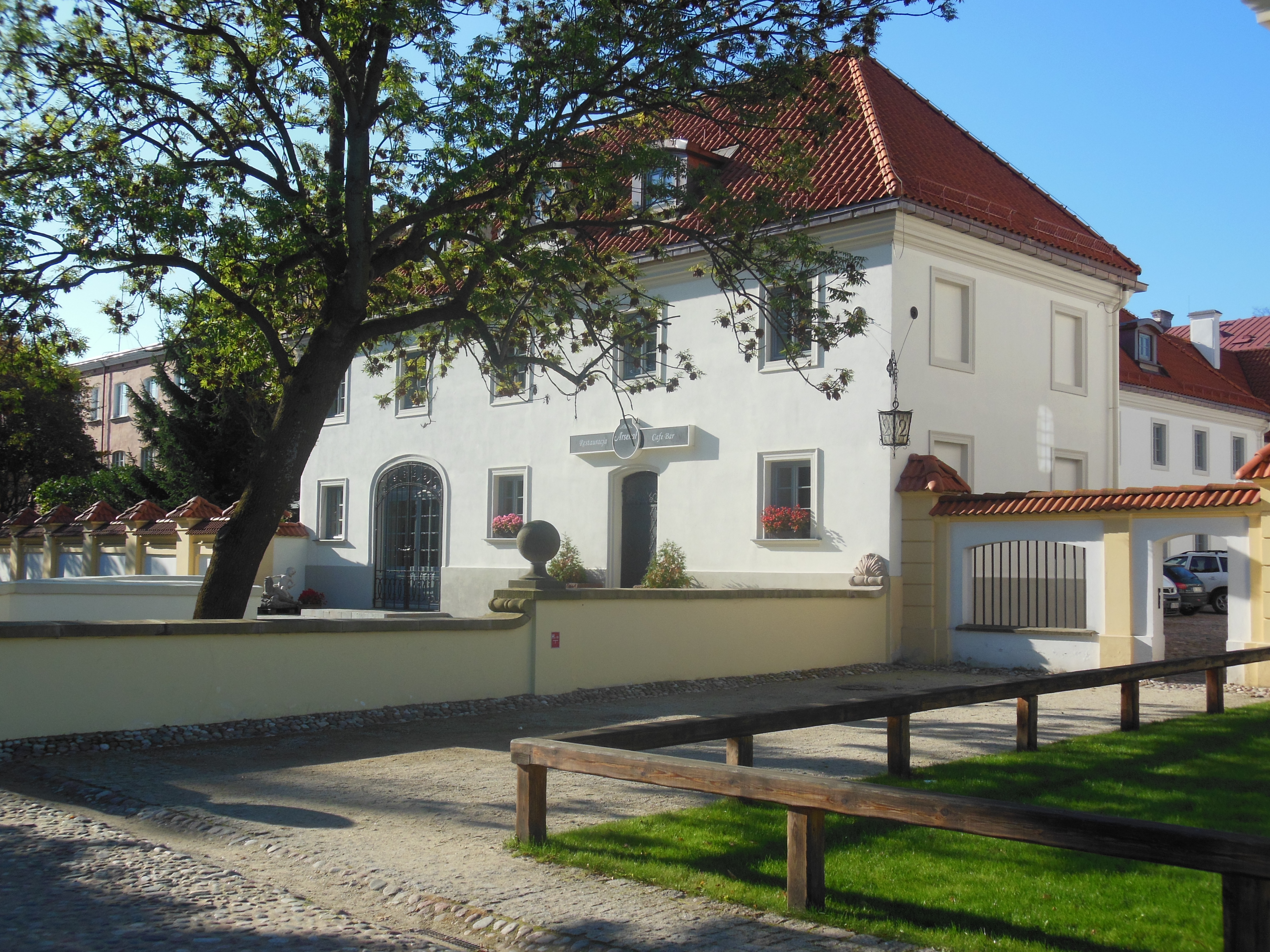
Galeria Arsenał

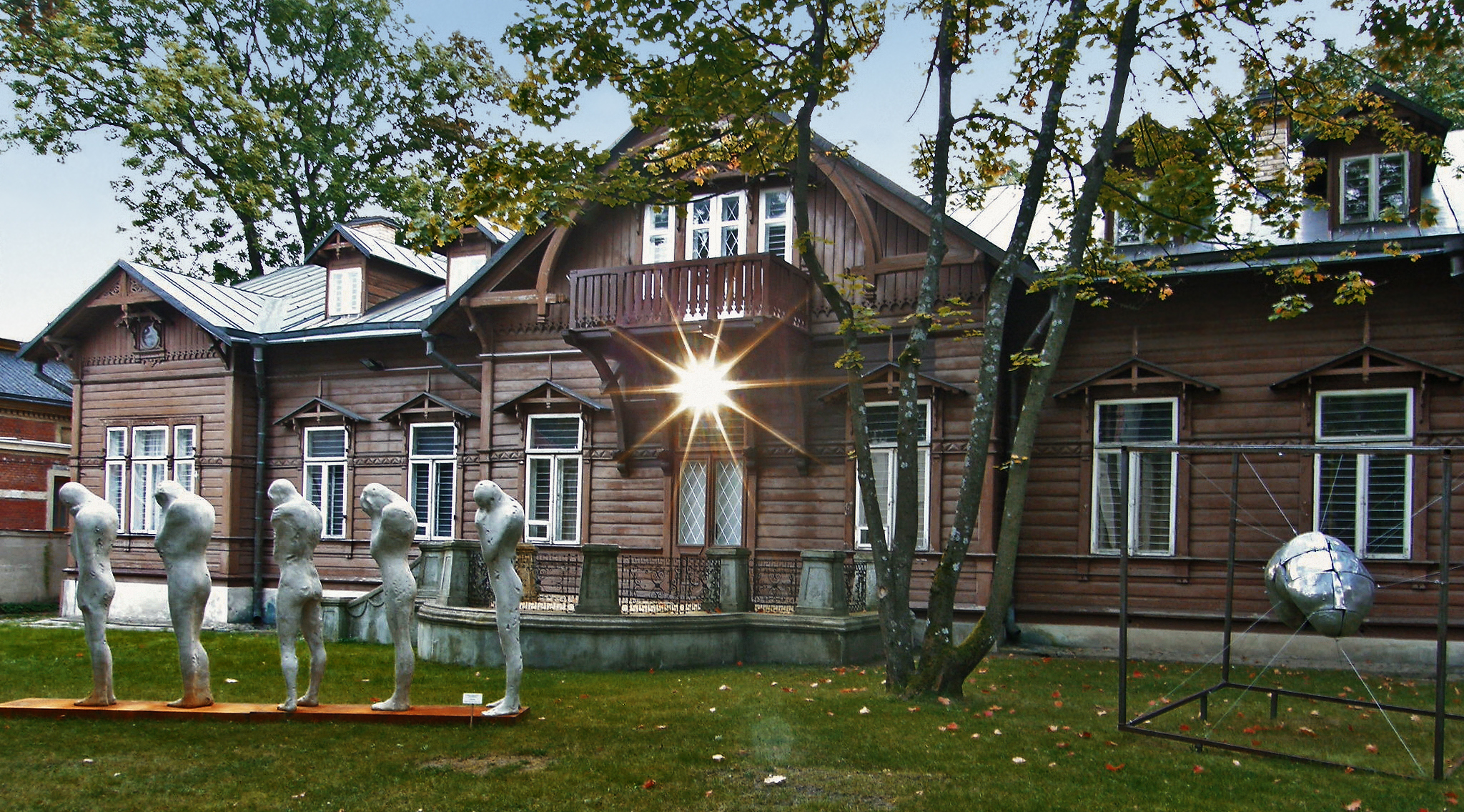
Alfons Karny Sculpture Museum

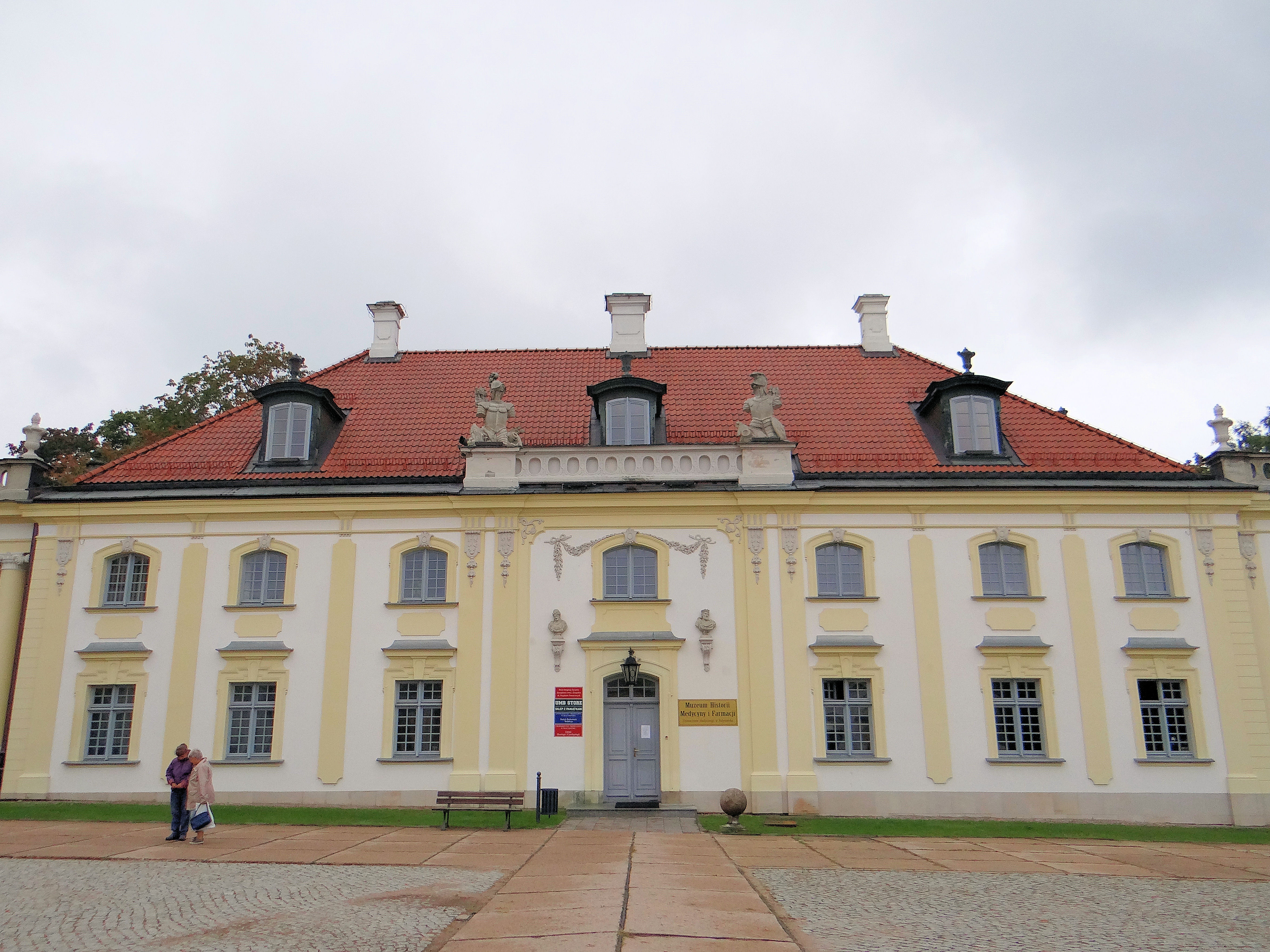
Museum of the History of Medicine and Pharmacy

There are a number of museums in the city including:

The Historical Museum in Białystok (Polish: Muzeum Historyczne w Białymstoku) is part of the Podlaskie Museum. The facility has a rich collection of archival materials and iconography illustrating the history of Białystok and Podlasie, and a number of middle-class cultural relics, especially in the field of craft utility. There are also the Numismatic Cabinet of the collection of 16 000 coins, medals and securities. The museum is in possession of the only collections in the country memorabilia connected with the Tatar settlement in the Polish–Lithuanian–Belarusian region.

The Army Museum in Białystok (Polish: Muzeum Wojska w Białymstoku) was established in September 1968 as a branch of the Podlaskie Museum to house the research and collections of many people connected with the military history of north-eastern Poland.

The Ludwik Zamenhof Centre (Polish: Centrum im. Ludwika Zamenhofa w Białymstoku) has a permanent exhibition, "Bialystok of Young Ludwik Zamenhof", and various temporary exhibitions, concerts, film projections, and theatre performances. The Centre has a branch of Łukasz Górnicki's Podlaska Library dedicated to the Esperanto language.

The Sybir Memorial Museum (Polish: Muzeum Pamięci Sybiru) is a historical museum opened in 2021 and dedicated to the memory of Poles, as well as people from other nationalities, the victims of forced deportations to Siberia perpetrated by the Russian Empire and the Soviet Union.

The Alfons Karny Sculpture Museum contains a collection of sculptures by Białystok native Alfons Karny.

The Medical University of Białystok operates the Museum of the History of Medicine and Pharmacy (Polish: Muzeum Historii Medycyny i Farmacji).

The Galeria Arsenał is a contemporary art gallery, located at a former 18th-century arsenal in the city center.

=== Parks and green spaces ===
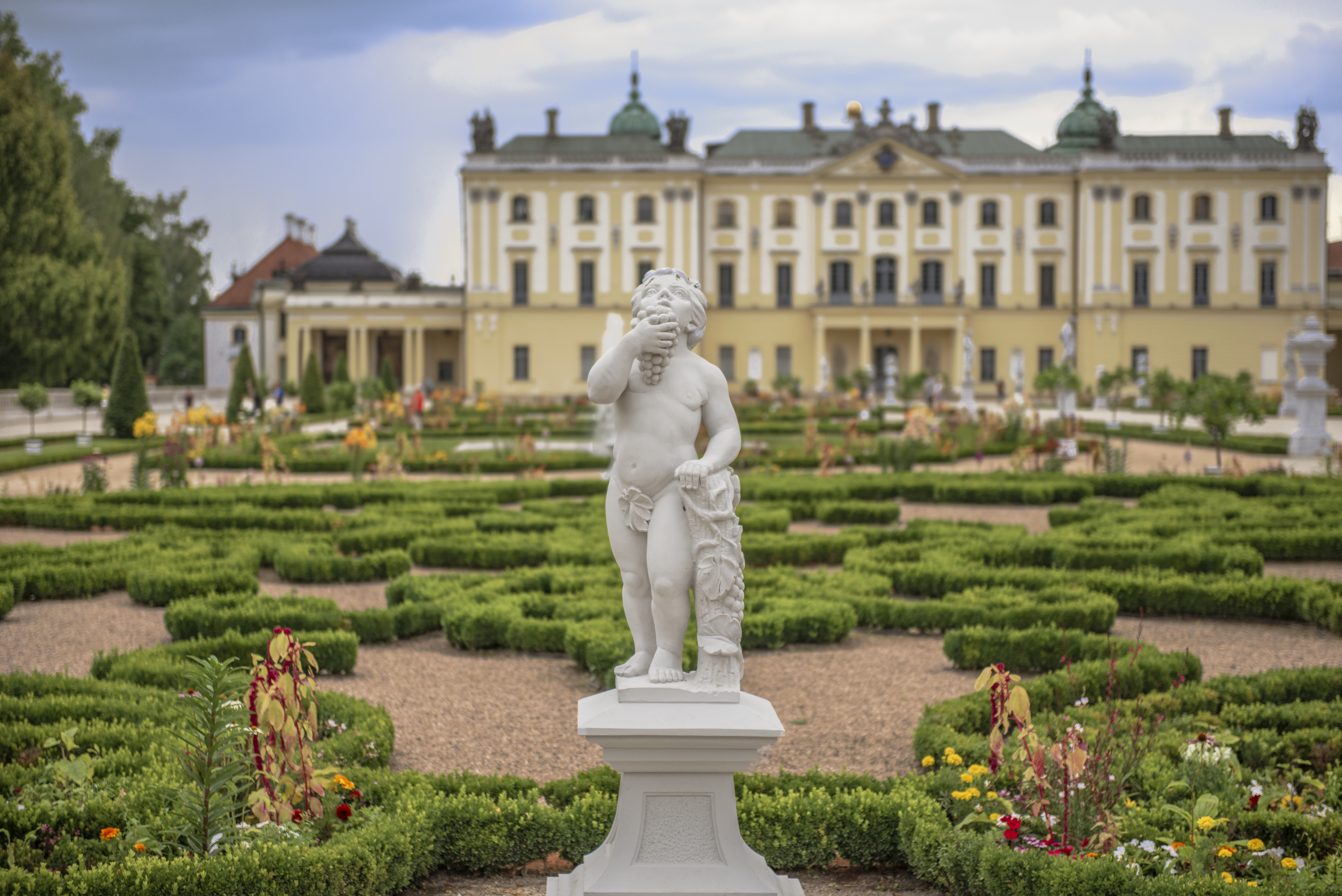
Branicki Park

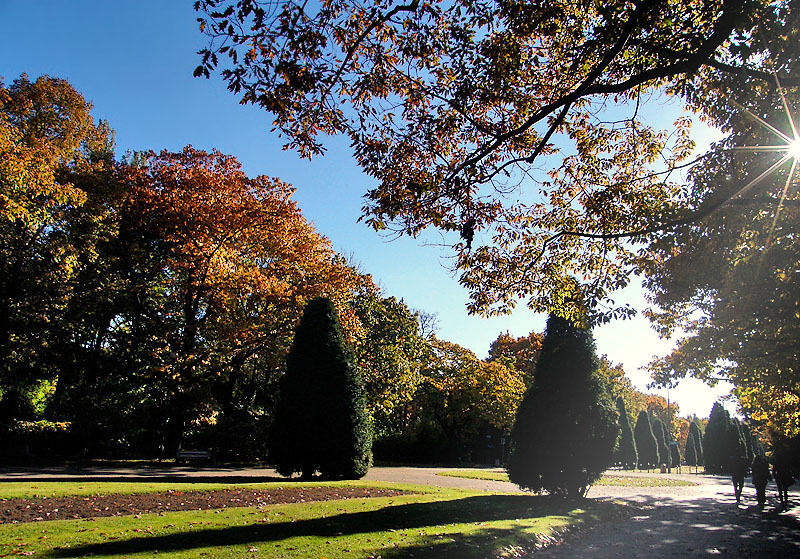
Planty Park

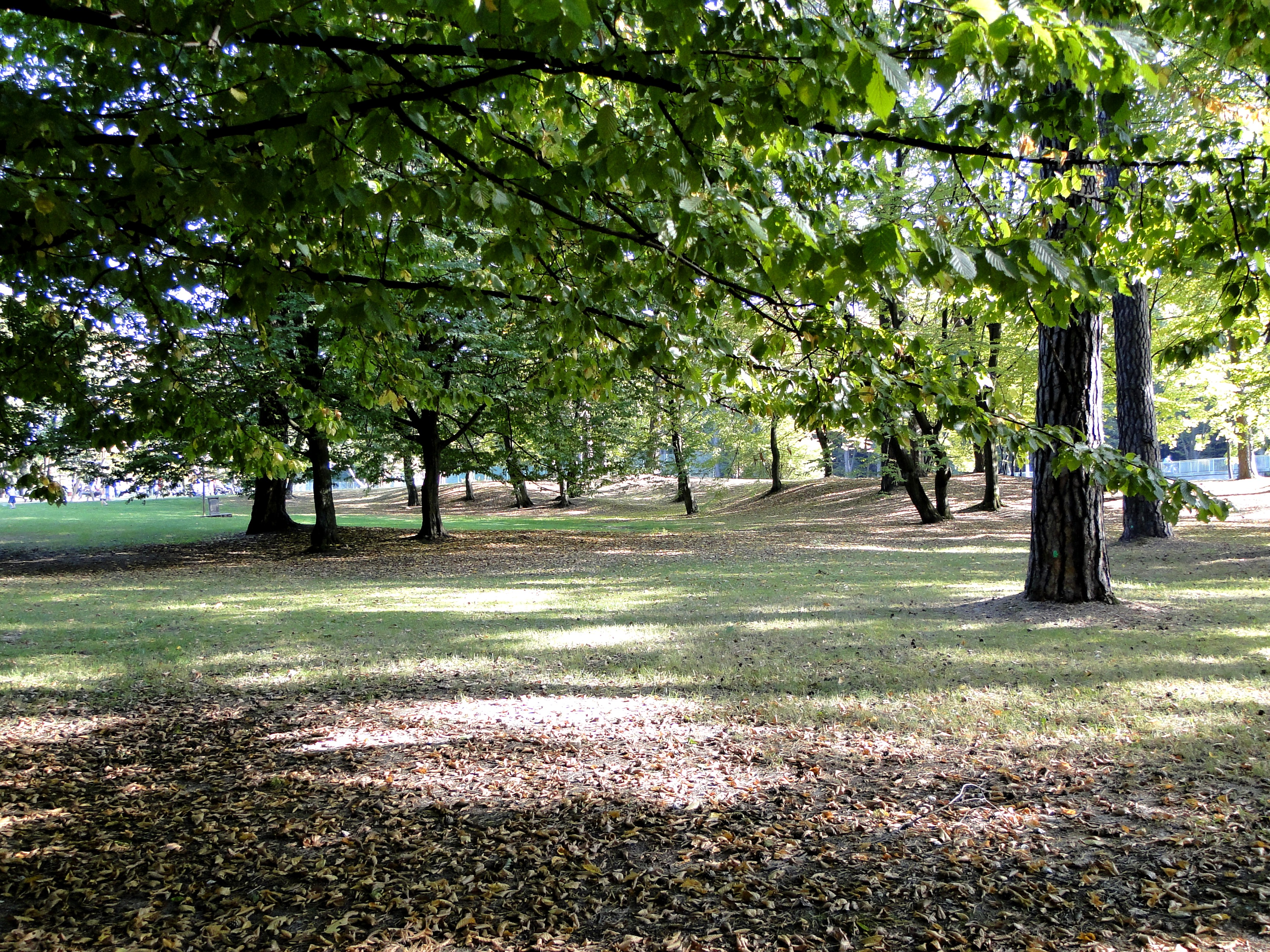
Constitution of 3 May Park

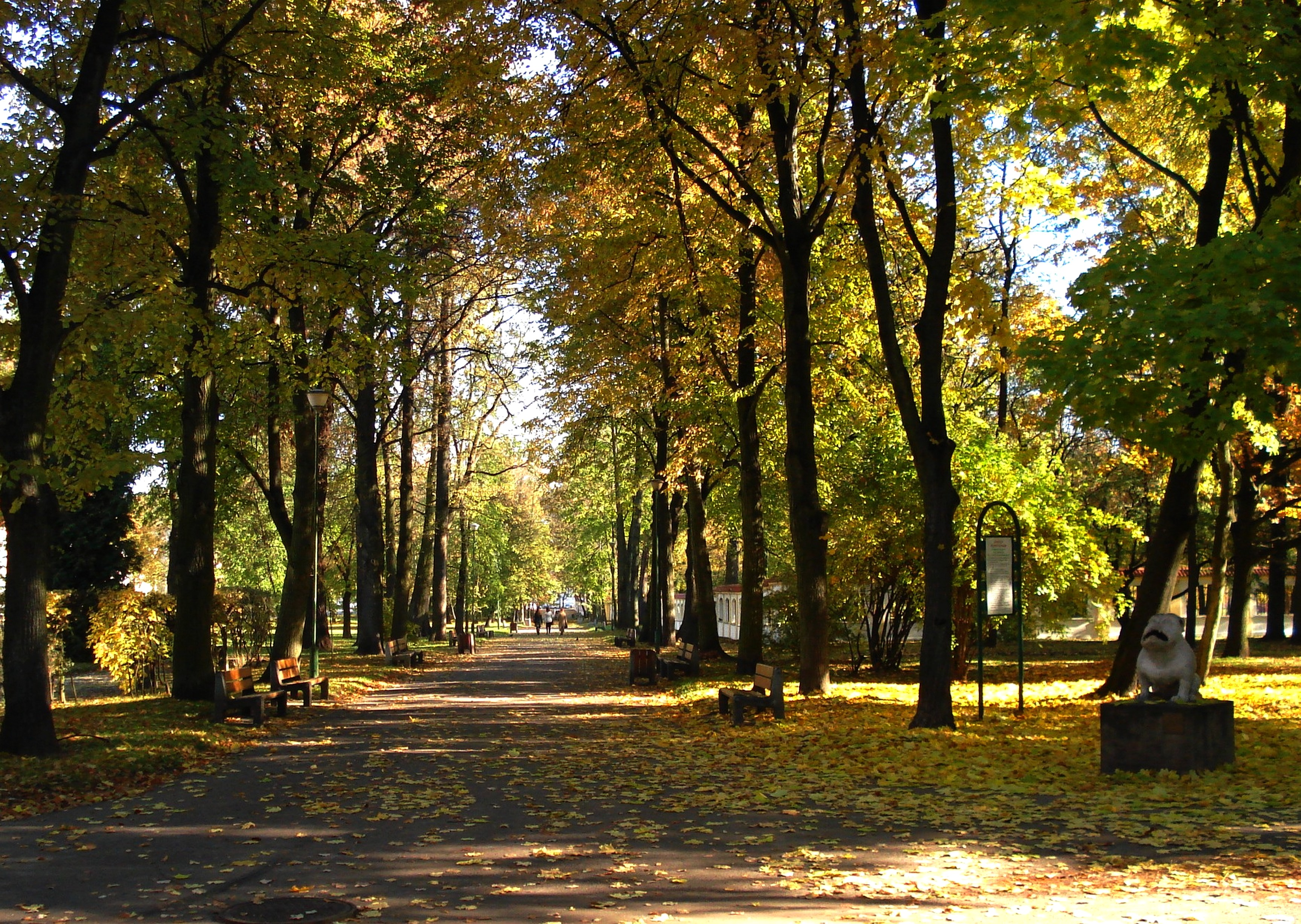
Kościałkowski Boulevards

Around 32% of the city is occupied by parks, squares and forest preserves which creates a unique and healthy climate. The green spaces include:

Branicki Palace (Polish: Pałac Branickich) is a historical edifice and 9.7 ha (24 acres) park in Białystok. It was developed on the site of an earlier building in the first half of the eighteenth century by Jan Klemens Branicki, wealthy Polish Crown Hetman (highest military leader of Poland), into a residence suitable for a man whose ambition was to be elected king of Poland. The palace complex with gardens, pavillons, sculptures, outbuildings and other structures and the city with churches, city hall and monastery, all built almost at the same time according to French models was the reason why the city was known in the eighteenth century as Versailles of Podlachia (Polish: wersal podlaski).

Planty is a 14.94 ha (36.9 acres) park created between 1930 and 1938, under the auspices of the then voivode Marian Zyndram-Kościałkowski in the areas adjacent to Branicki Palace. The modernist composition of the park was designed by Stanislav Gralla.

=== Architecture ===
The various historically driven changes have had a very significant influence on the architectural space of the city. Most other Polish cities have suffered similarly, but the processes in Białystok, have had a particularly intense course. Numerous historic works of architecture no longer exist, while many others have been rebuilt to their original configuration. Very few historic buildings of the city have been preserved – the sights are merely an echo of the old historical shape of Białystok.

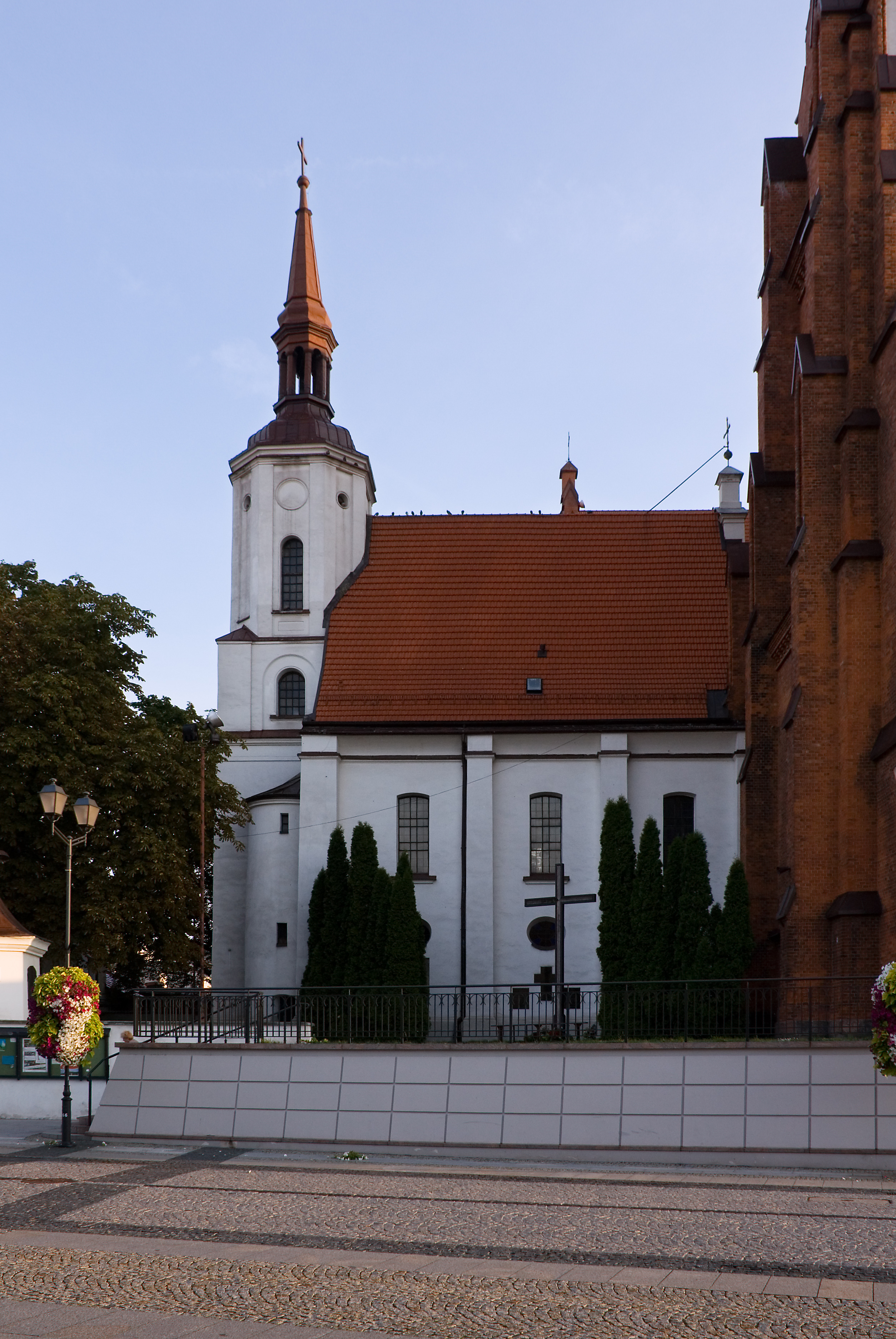
Renaissance-era old parish church

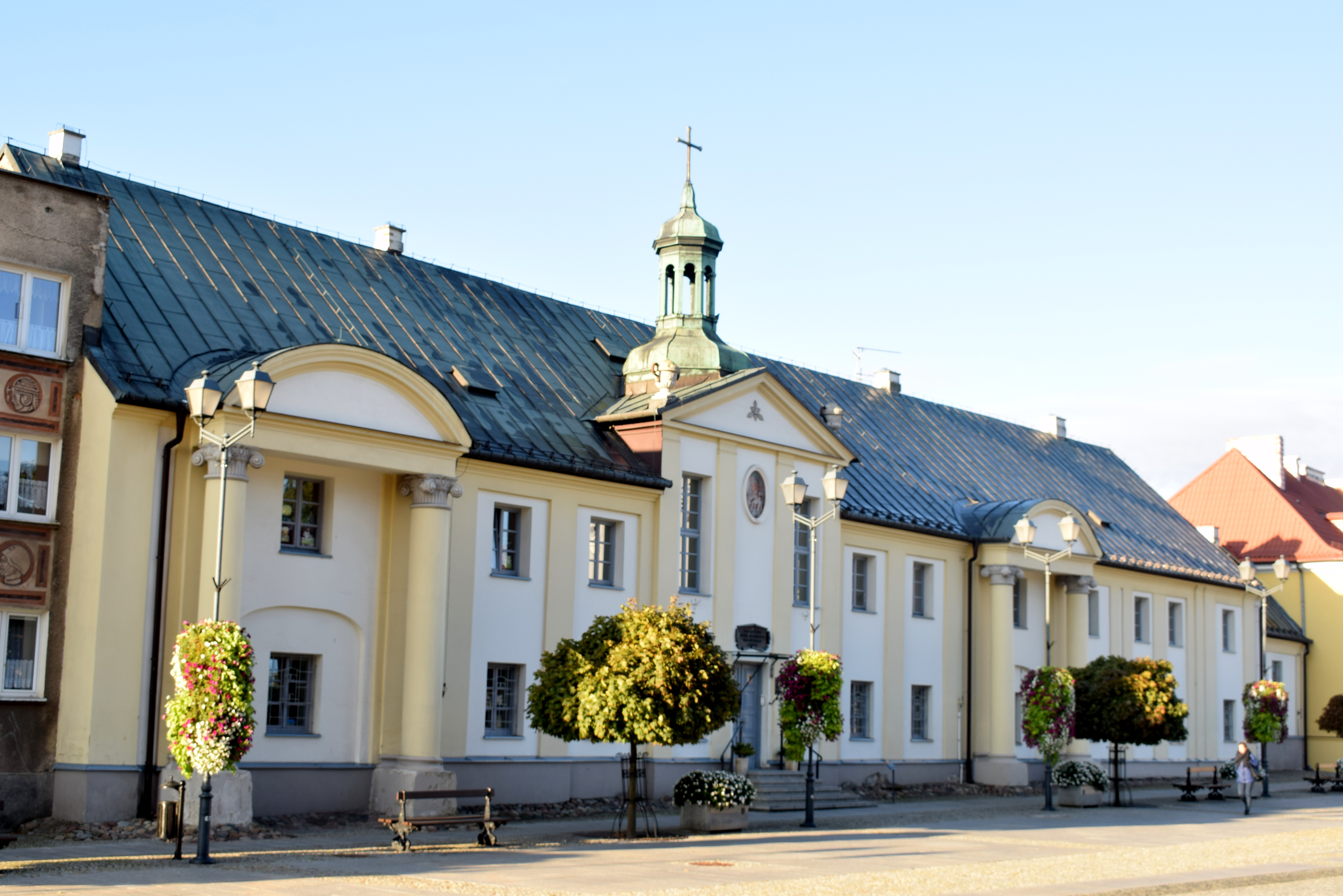
Baroque Daughters of Charity Monastery

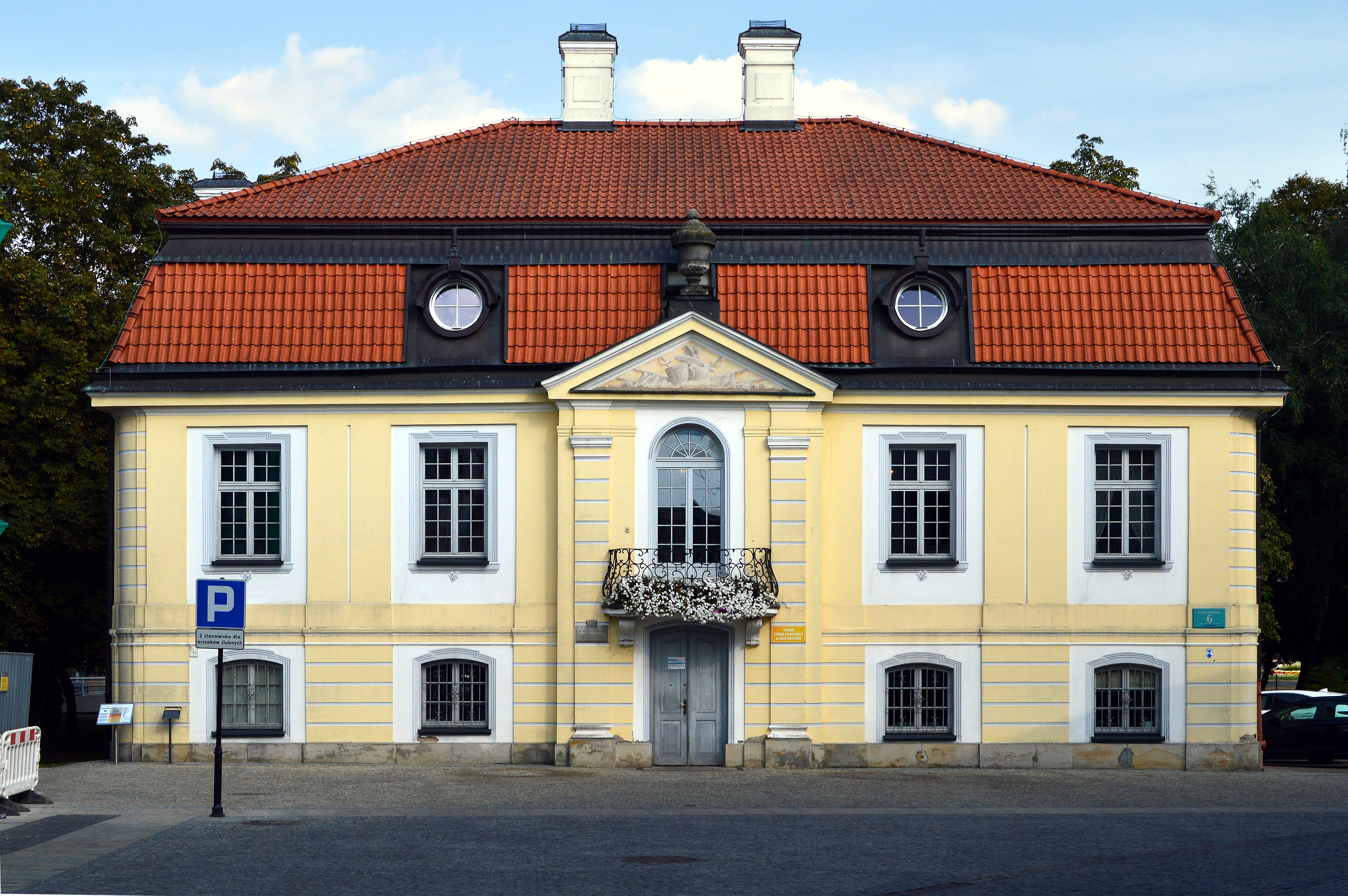
Branicki Guest Palace

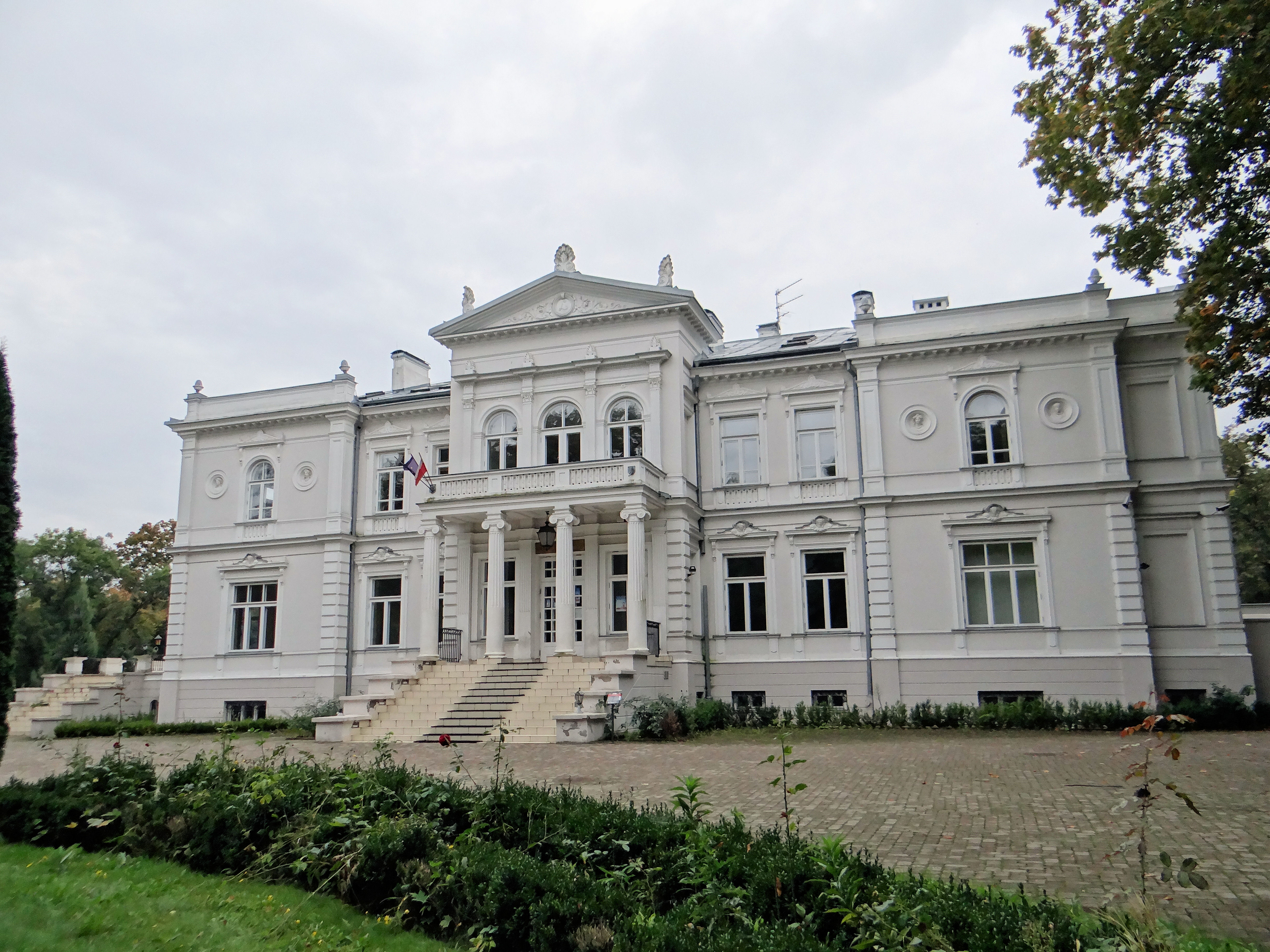
Lubomirski Palace

Main sights include:

- Branicki Palace, built in 18th century in Baroque style
- Town Hall, built in 18th century in Baroque style
- Other palaces: Branicki Guest Palace, Lubomirski Palace, Hasbach Palace, Nowik Palace
- Orthodox Cathedral of St. Nicholas, built in 1843–1846 in Neoclassicist style
- Białystok railway station, built in 1861 in Neoclassicist style
- Catholic Cathedral, dating back to 16th century, rebuilt in 1900–1905 in Gothic Revival style
- St. Adalbert Church, built in 1909–1912 in Romanesque Revial style, former Lutheran, today Roman-Catholic
- St. Roch Church, built in 1927–1946, Expressionist
- Aleksandr Węgierki Drama Theatre, built in 1938, modernist
- Socialist realist building of the University of Białystok (former regional headquarters of the Polish United Workers' Party)
- Church of the Resurrection, built in 1991–1996 in Neo-Baroque style as a copy of destroyed Basilian Church and Monastery in Berezwecz
- Opera and Philharmonic, built in 2006–2012, Postmodern style
- Daughters of Charity Monastery
- Former Arsenal
- Former Masonic Lodge

=== Local cuisine ===
In additional to traditional nationwide Polish cuisine and regional Podlaskie cuisine, a local type of boza, a traditional fermented drink more common in the Balkans, Central Asia and the Caucasus, is produced in Białystok, and the bialy bread roll, popular in New York City, originated here, with both listed as traditional foods and beverages by the Ministry of Agriculture and Rural Development of Poland.

== Sports ==
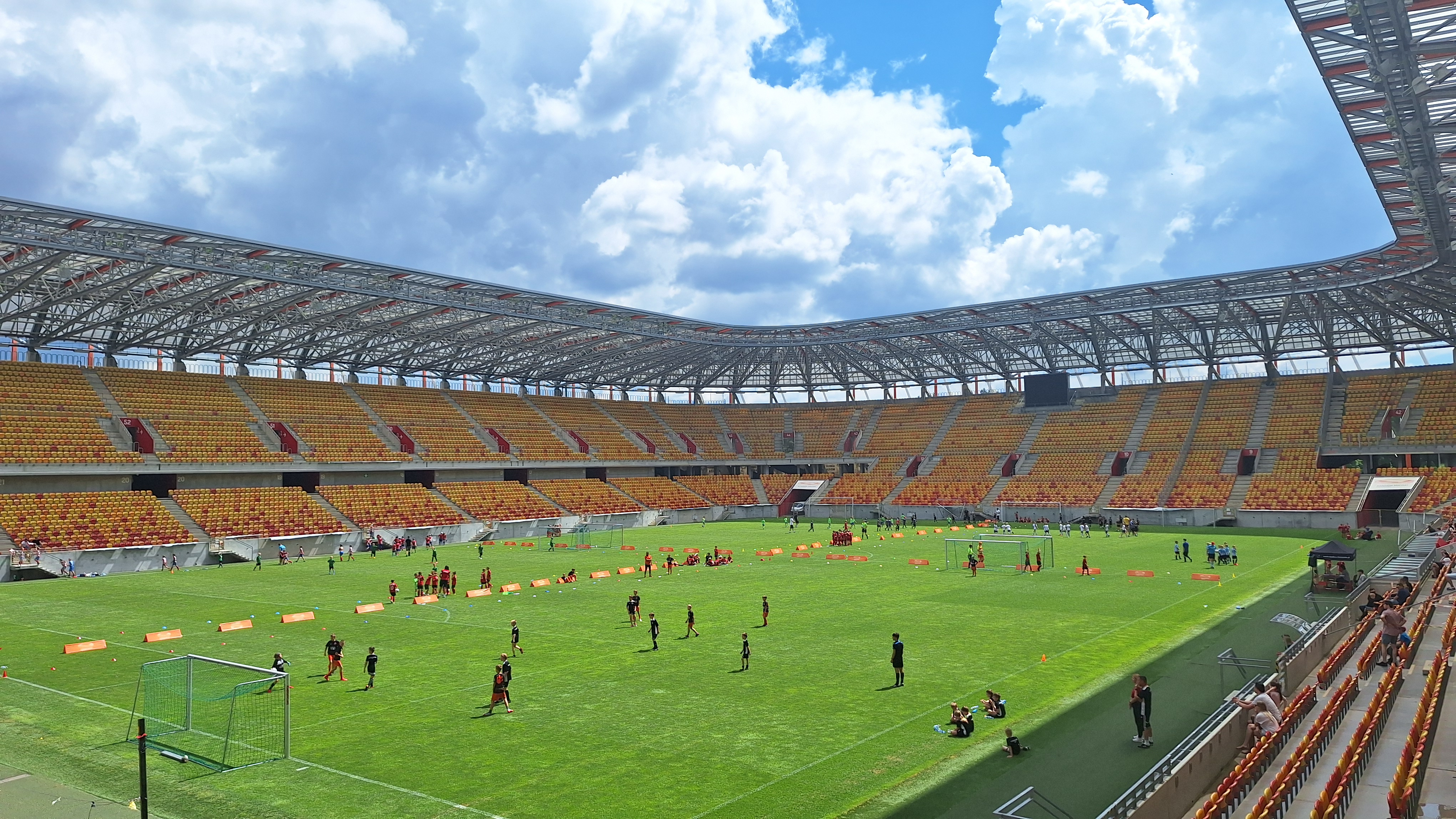
Białystok Municipal Stadium

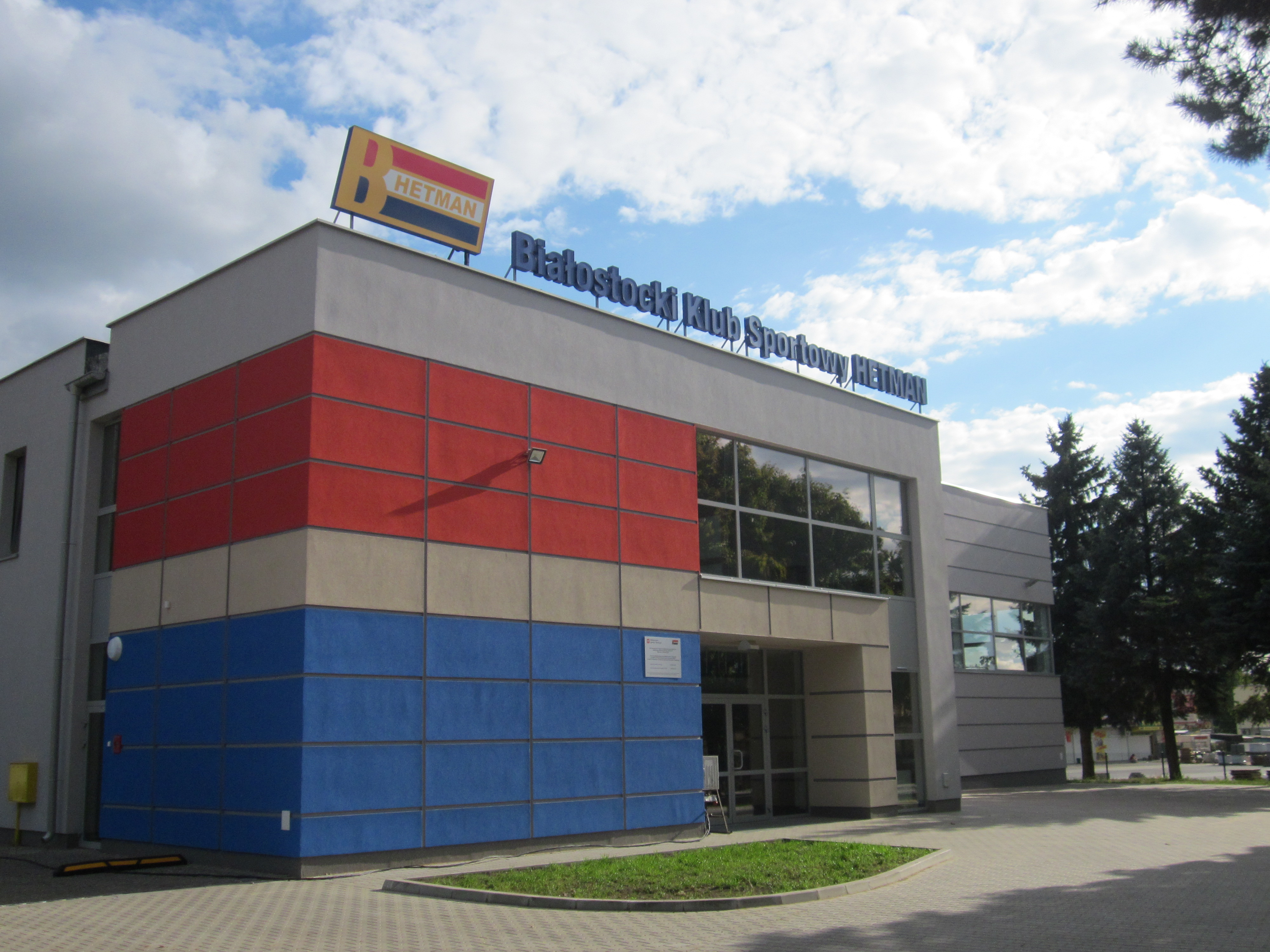
Headquarters of Hetman Białystok multi-sport club

The city has both professional and amateur sports teams, and a number of venues where they are based. Jagiellonia Białystok is a Polish football club, based in Białystok, in the Ekstraklasa (Poland's top division) that plays at the Białystok Municipal Stadium. Jagiellonia Białystok won the Polish Cup and Super Cup in 2010, and the Polish Championship in 2024. A new 22,500-seat stadium was completed at the beginning of 2015. There is also a futsal team Słoneczny Stok Jagiellonia Białystok, which plays in the Futsal Ekstraklasa, Poland's top division (as of 2022–23).

Podlasie Białystok is one of the top athletics clubs in Poland, multiple times Polish Team Champions, most recently in 2022.

Lowlanders Białystok is an American football club, that plays in the Polish Football League (Polish: Polska Futbol Liga), and are three-times Polish Bowl champions.

Other notable clubs include men's football team Hetman Białystok (with additional boxing and contract bridge sections), basketball club Żubry Białystok, and football club Włókniarz Białystok with both men's and women's sections, however, all of the aforementioned teams play in the lower leagues as of 2022–23.

== Media ==
Białystok has a wide variety of media outlets serving the city and surrounding region. There are two locally published daily newspapers, Gazeta Współczesna (36.3% market share) and Kurier Poranny (20.3% market share). In addition two national papers have local bureaus. There are a number of national and locally produced television and radio channels available both over-the-air from the nearby RTCN Białystok (Krynice) Mast, the seventh highest structure in Poland, in addition to transmitter sites within the city. TVP Białystok is one of the locally produced, regional branches of the TVP, Poland's public television broadcaster. There is also a cable television system available within the city. The city has two campus radio stations; Radiosupeł at the Medical University of Białystok and Radio Akadera at Białystok Technical University.

== Religion ==
Religion in Białystok (2021)
1. Catholicism (64.0%)
2. Eastern Orthodoxy (10.0%)
3. Protestantism (0.50%)
4. Islam (0.14%)
5. Other (0.10%)
6. Irreligion (6.00%)
7. Undeclared (19.0%)

In the early 1900s, Białystok was reputed to have the largest concentration of Jews of all the cities in the world. In 1931, 40,000 Jews lived in the city, nearly half the city's inhabitants. The city is the seat of the Roman Catholic Archdiocese of Białystok. Pope John Paul II on 5 June 1991, during a visit to Białystok, announced the establishment of the Archdiocese of Białystok which ended the period of the temporary church administration of the portion of the Archdiocese of Vilnius that had, after World War II, remained within the Polish borders. The city is also the seat of the Białystok-Gdańsk Diocese of the Autocephalous Polish Orthodox Church. Białystok is the largest concentration of Orthodox believers in Poland. In Białystok, the following Protestant churches exist: a Lutheran parish, two Pentecostal churches, Baptist church, a congregation of the Church of God in Christ and a Seventh Day Adventist church.

Białystok is home to more than two thousand Muslims (mainly Tatars). There is an Islamic Centre, a House of Prayer, and various organisations. There is a magazine issued – "Pamięć i trwanie" ("Memory and persistence").

The city is the site of the Divine Mercy Sanctuary with the main relics of Michał Sopoćko.

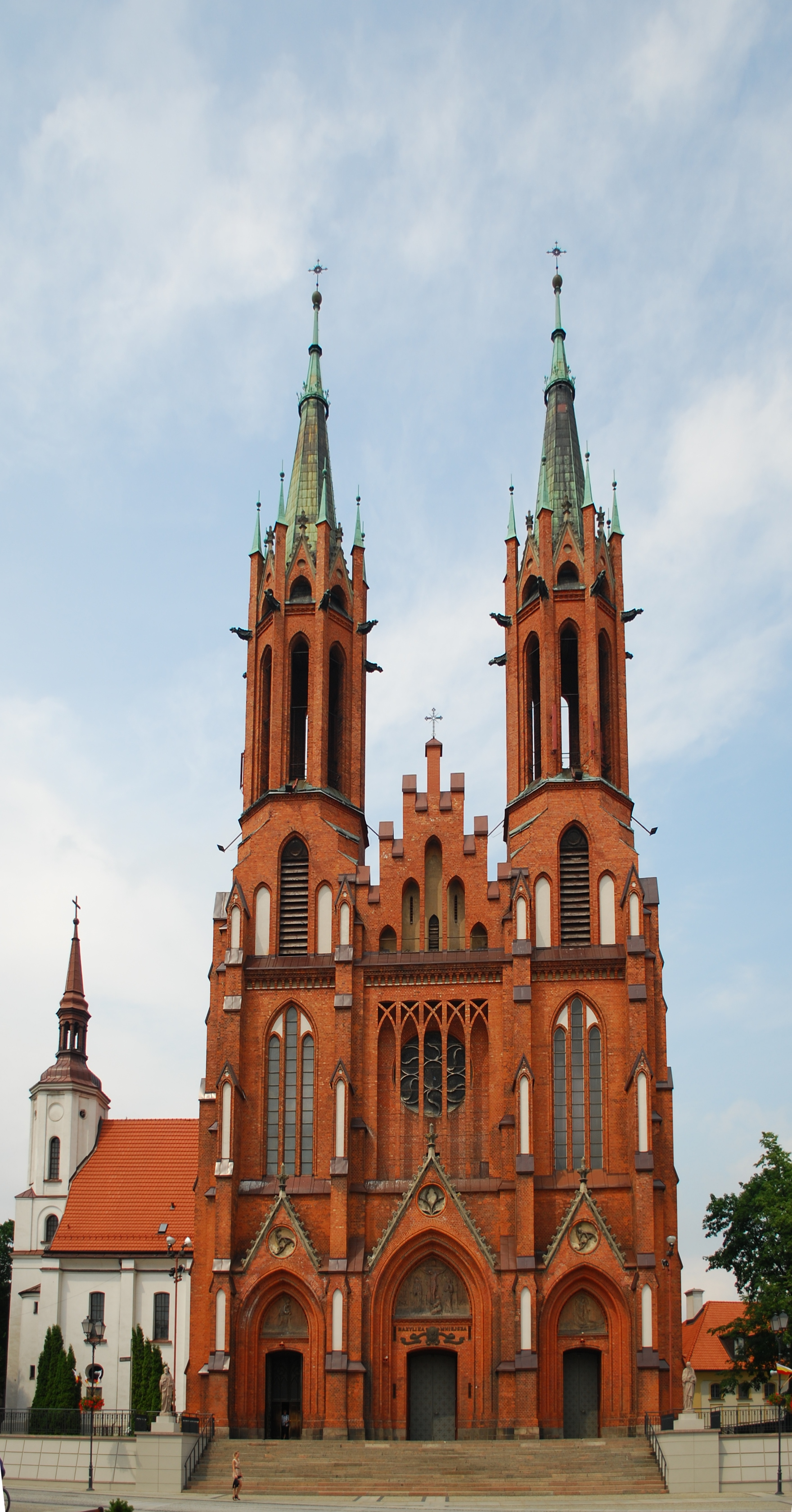
Basilica of the Assumption of the Blessed Virgin Mary

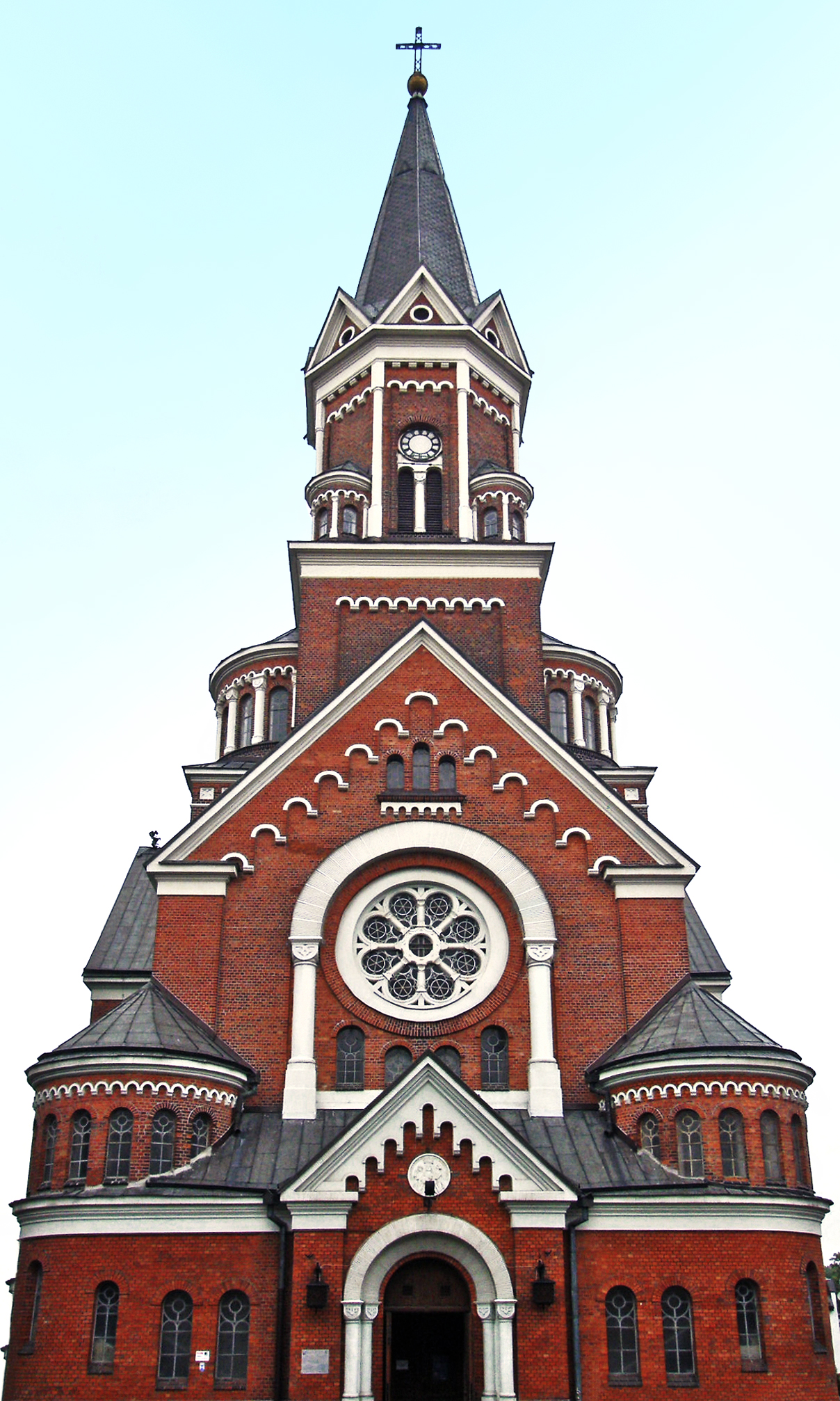
Saint Adalbert church

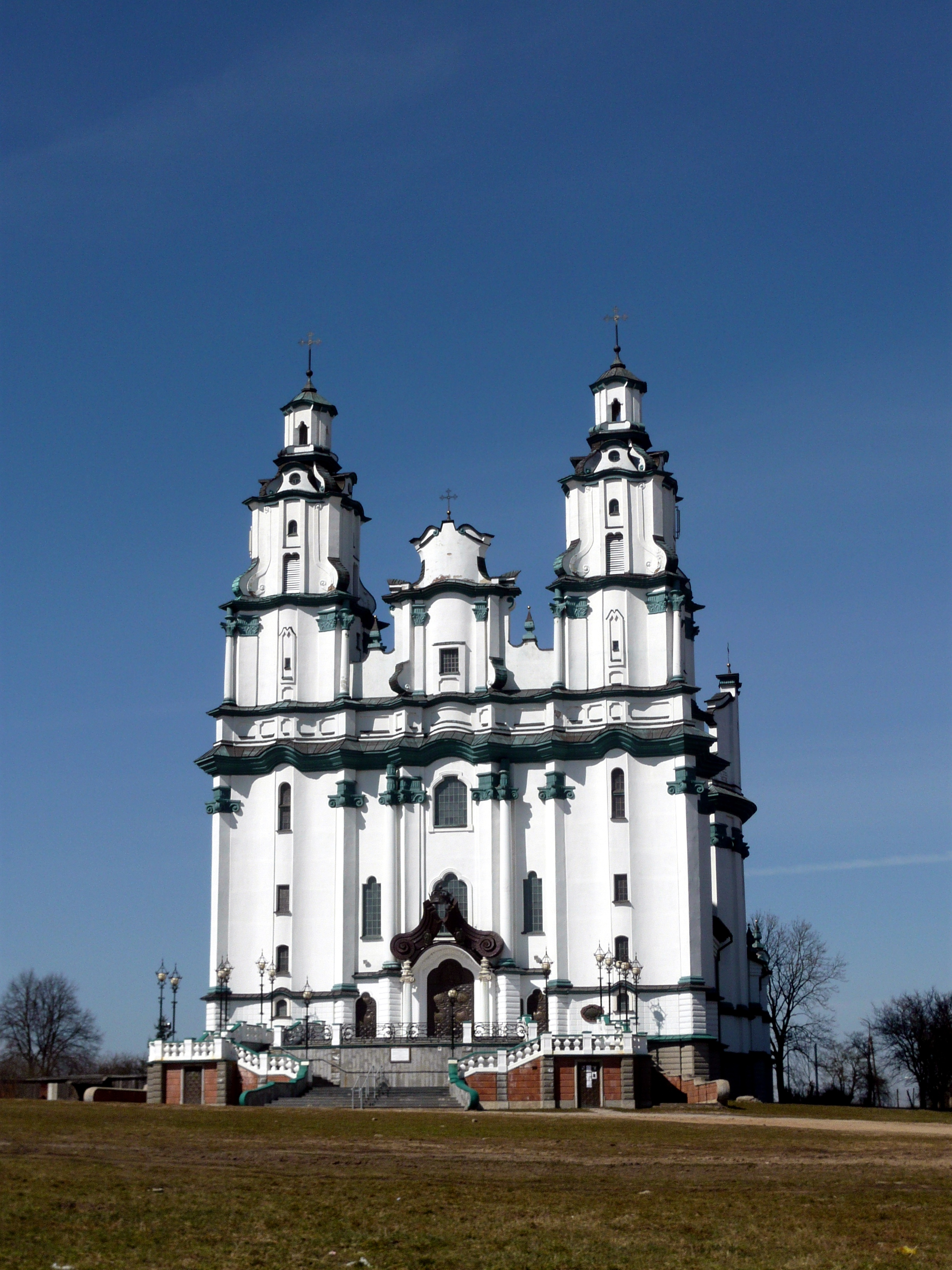
Church of the Lord's Resurrection

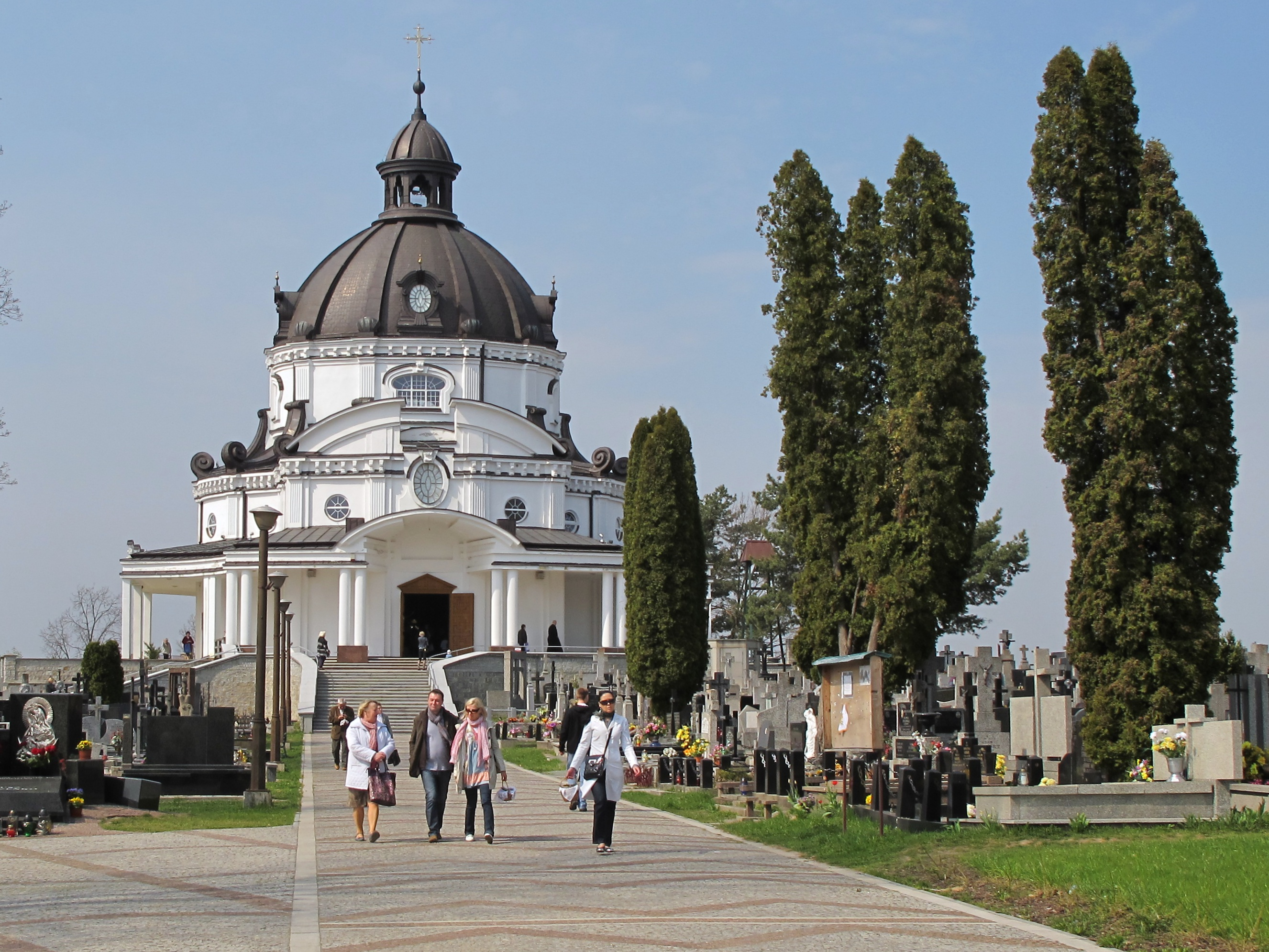
All Saints' Church

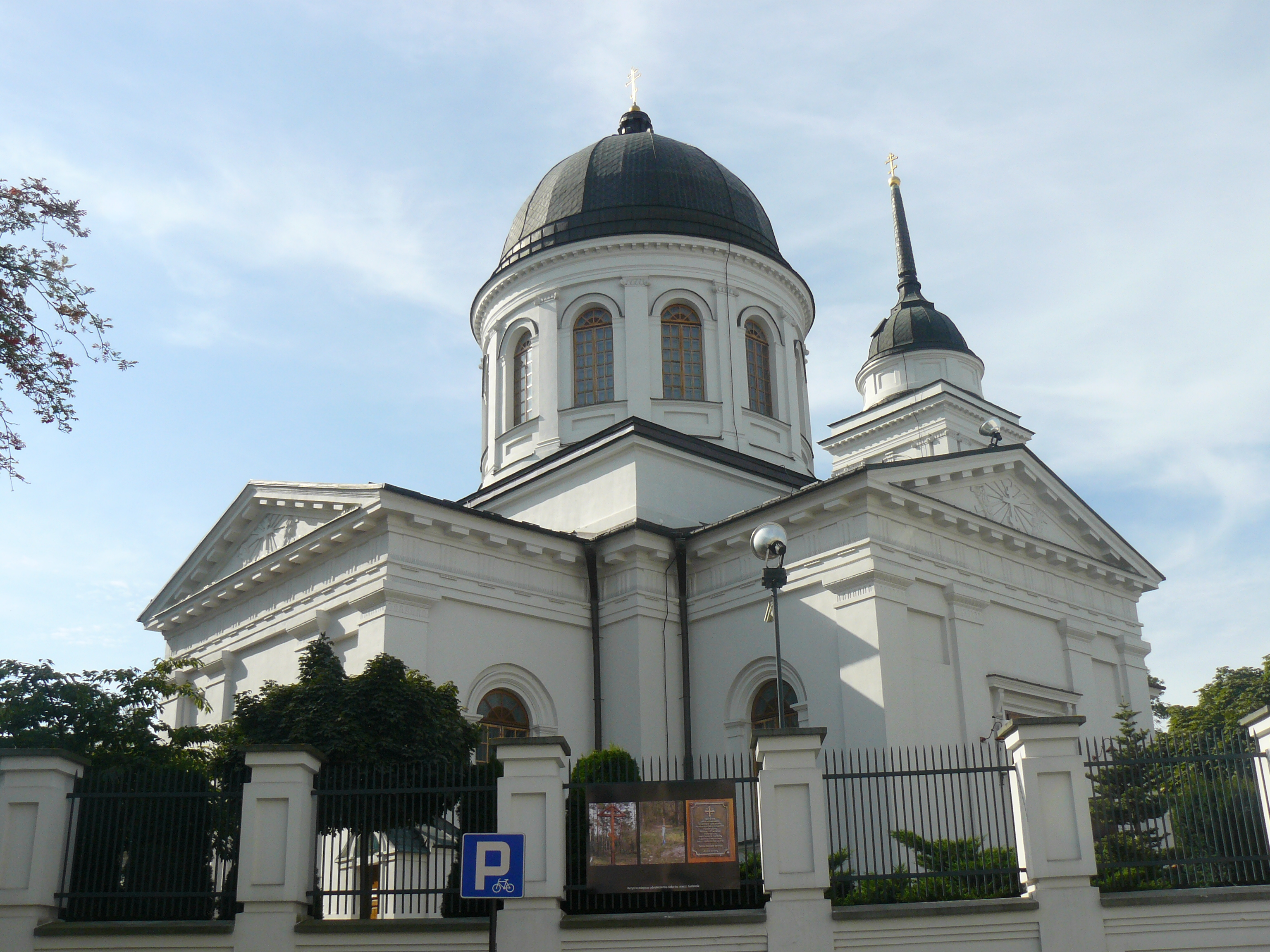
Orthodox Cathedral of St. Nicholas

== Transport ==
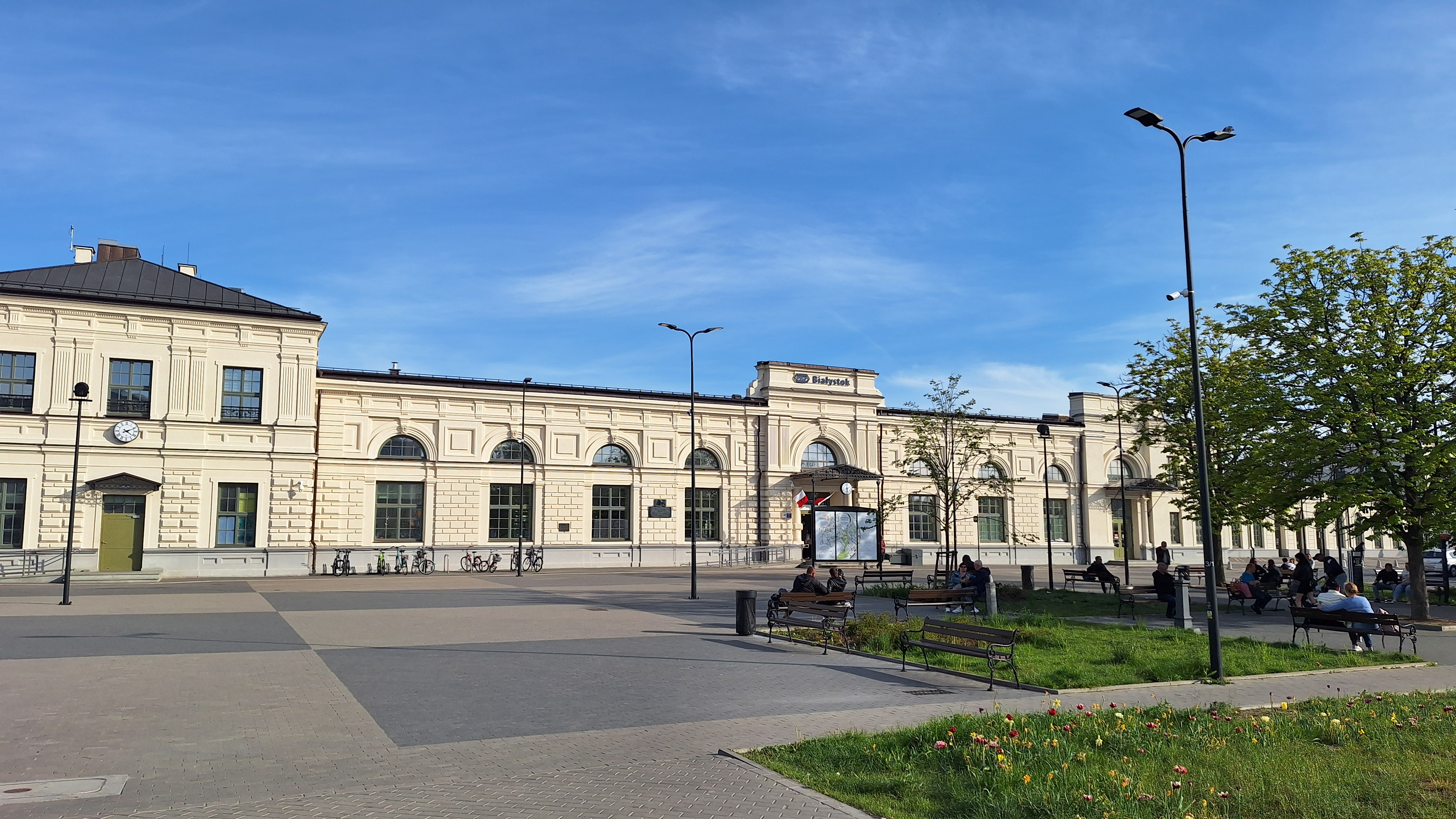
Białystok railway station

The city is and has been for centuries, the main hub of transportation for the Podlaskie Voivodeship and the entire northeastern section of Poland. It is a major city on the European Union roadways (Via Baltica) and railways (Rail Baltica) to the Baltic Republics and Finland. It is also a main gateway of trade with Belarus due to its proximity to the border and its current and longstanding relationship with Grodno, Belarus.

A traffic management system has been operating in Białystok since 2015. At 120 intersections, traffic lights are coordinated in such a way that cars and buses covered the route as quickly as possible. Special cameras record traffic, travel time. Drivers receive this information on 19 boards set among others at the intersections on Wasilkowska Street, Antoniuk-Fabryczny Street and Kleeberga Street.

=== Railways ===
Passenger trains connect from Suwałki, Grodno and Lithuania to Warsaw and the rest of the European passenger network. Passenger services are provided by two rail service providers, PKP Intercity that provides intercity passengers trains (express, intercity, eurocity, hotel and TLK) and Polregio that operates only regional passenger trains financed by the voivodeship. Passenger trains are mostly run using electrical multiple units (on electrified lines) or rail buses.

=== Buses ===
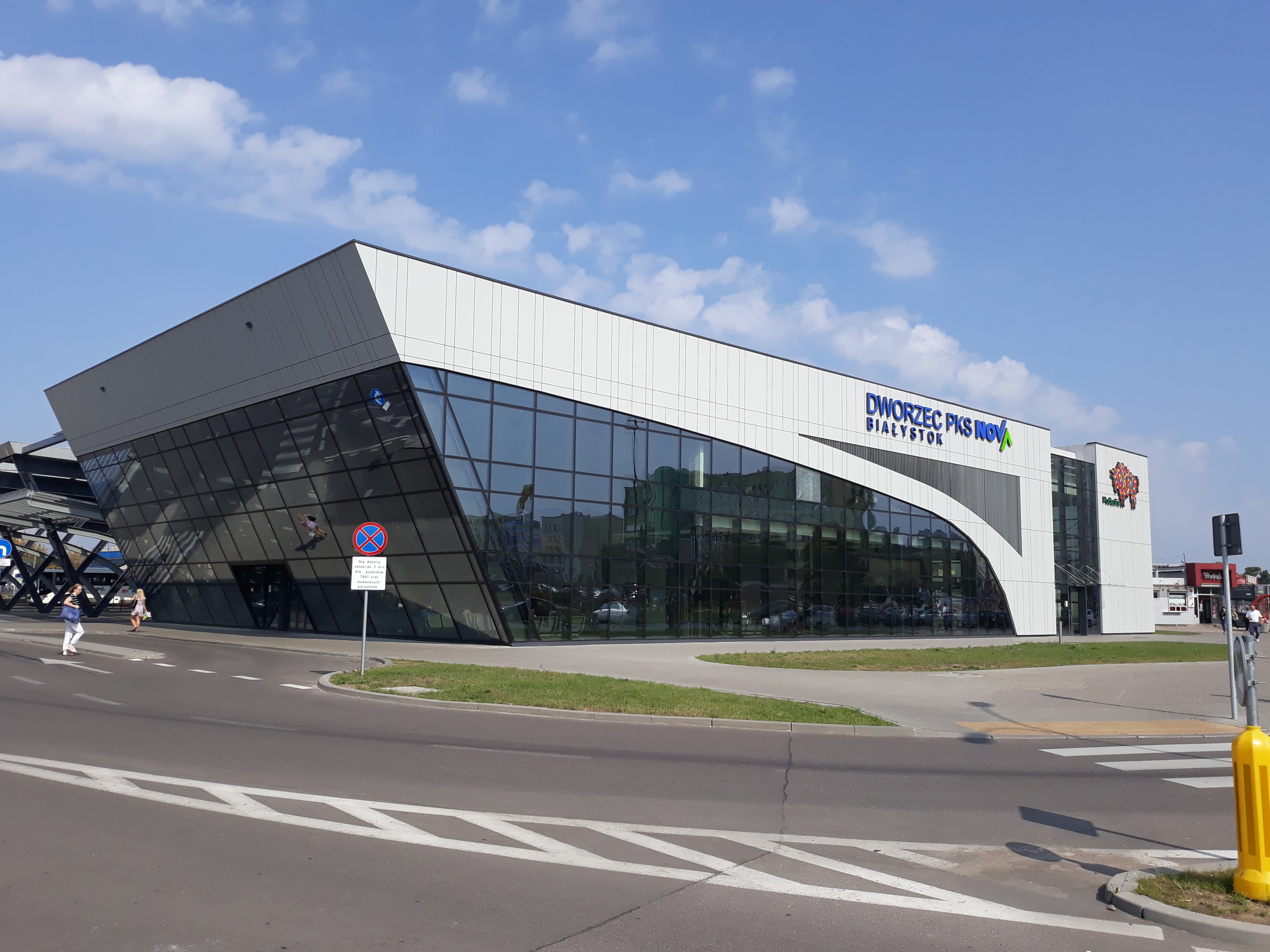
Main bus station

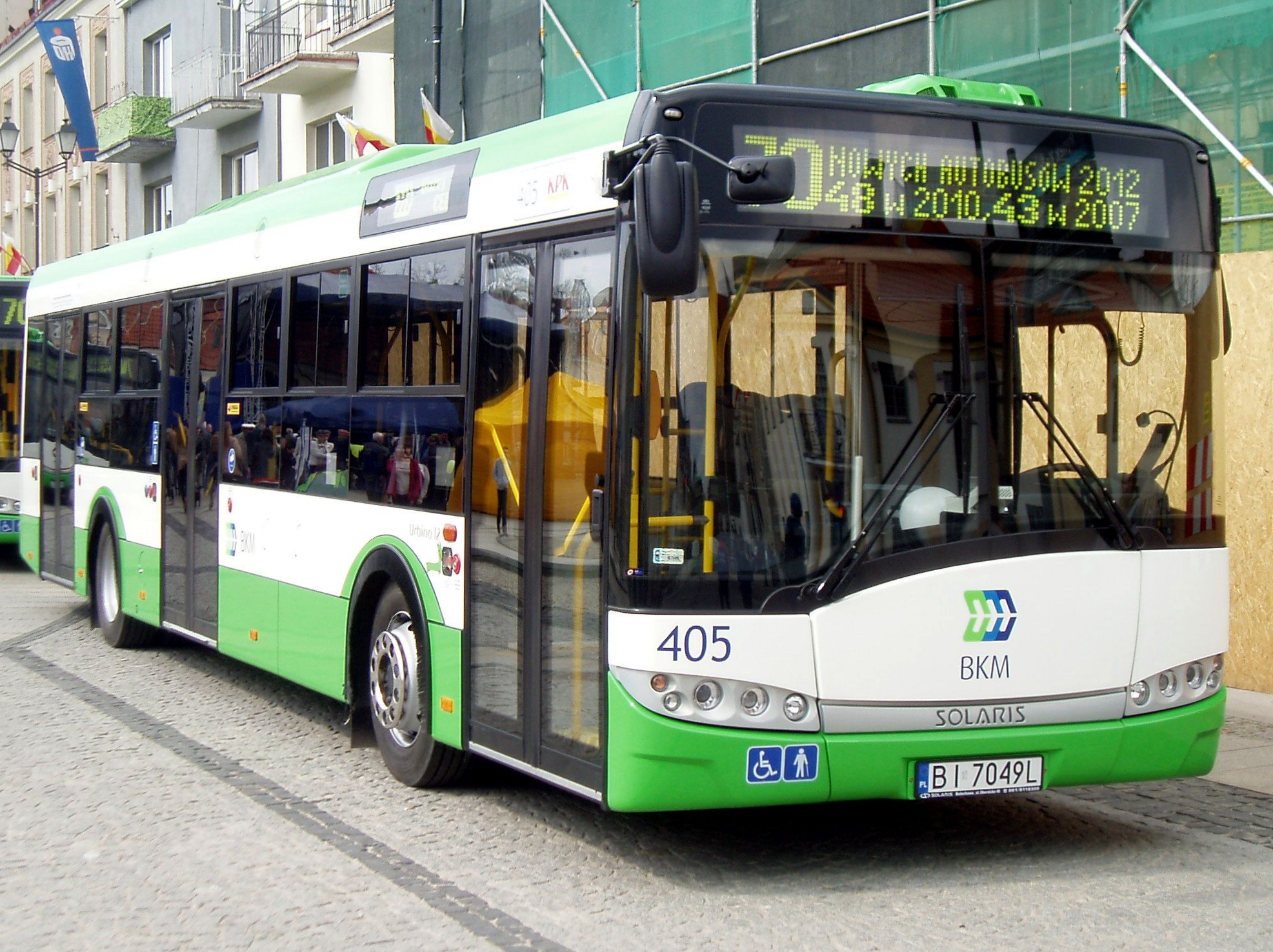
Solaris Urbino 18 W29 bus operated by BKM in Białystok

There is an extensive bus network that covers the entire city by three bus services, but no tram or subway exists. The three bus operators (KPKM, KPK and KZK) are owned by the city and each shares approximately a third of the lines and the bus fleet.

=== Roads and highways ===
The National Roads (Polish: Droga krajowa) running through Białystok:

- DK 8 / E67: Budzisko (Lithuania–Poland border) – Białystok – Warsaw – Wrocław – Kudowa-Zdrój (Czech–Polish border)
- DK 19: Rzeszów – Lublin – Bielsk Podlaski – Białystok – Kuźnica (Belarus–Poland border)
- DK 65: Gołdap (Poland–Russia border)-Ełk-Białystok-Bobrowniki (Belarus–Poland border)

The expressways (Polish: Droga ekspresowa) near Białystok:

- S 8 / E67: Białystok – Warsaw – Wrocław
- S 19 (projected): Rzeszów – Lublin – Bielsk Podlaski – Białystok – Kuźnica (Belarus–Polish border)

The Voivodeship roads (Polish: Droga wojewódzka) running through Białystok:

- DW 669: Trasa Niepodległości (Narodowych Sił Zbrojnych Street, Niepodległości Avenue, Padarewskiego Avenue)
- DW 675: Tysiąclecia Państwa Polskiego Avenue (Polish: aleja Tysiąclecia Państwa Polskiego)
- DW 676: Porosły - Białystok - Supraśl - Krynki
- DW 678: Białystok - Wysokie Mazowieckie

In Białystok Country (Polish: powiat białostocki) there are also Poviat roads (Polish: Droga powiatowa) which connect Białystok with other towns in the area: (Note: The mentioned roads do not pass through the city.)

Poviat roads
- Poviat Road 1431 B: Białystok (42 Pułku Piechoty Street) - Sowlany
- Poviat Road 1432 B: Białystok (Ciołkowskiego and Baranowicka streets) - Zielona,
- Poviat Road 1483 B: Białystok (Filipowicza) - Hryniewicze
- Poviat Road 1484 B: Białystok (Mickiewicza Street) - Stanisławowo
- Poviat Road 1485 B: Białystok (Plażowa Street) - Dojlidy Górne
- Poviat Road 1493 B: Białystok (Wiosenna Street) - Olmonty
- Poviat Road 1535 B: Białystok (Popiełuszki, Hetmańska and Wierzbowa Streets) - Choroszcz
- Poviat Road 1550 B: Białystok (Niewodnicka, Meksykańska, Nowosielska and Elewatorska streets) - Klepacze - Niewodnica Kościelna,
- Poviat Road 1559 B: Białystok - Kleosin

=== Bicycle ===
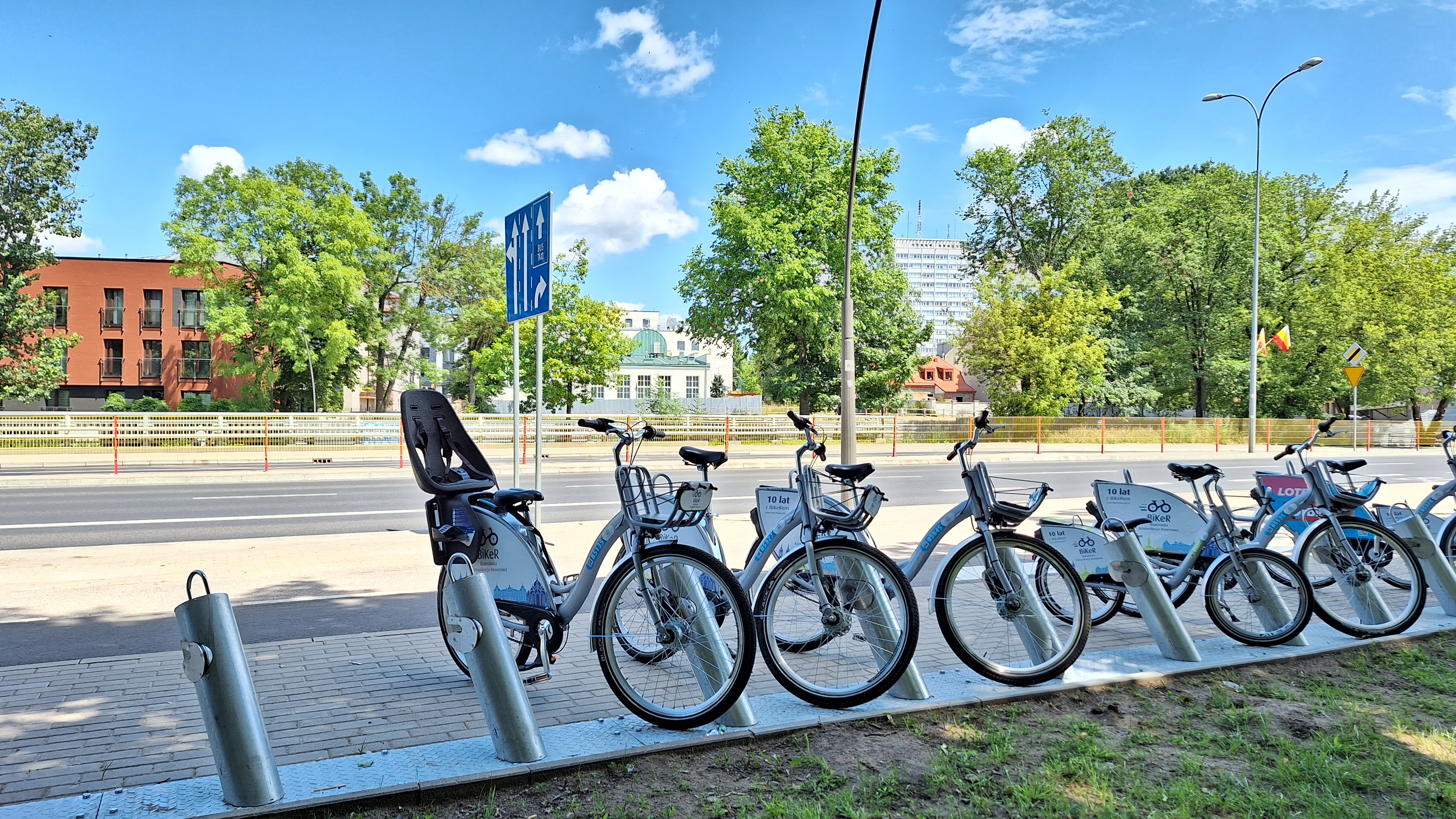
BiKeR bicycle racks in Białystok

By 2020, there were already over 158 km (98 mi) of bicycle paths in Białystok. The municipal bicycle renting system is called BiKeR and was opened in 2014. The system was initially based on 30 stations equipped with 300 bikes. The city has four public bicycle repair stations, in which one can fix their private bikes. The stations are located in places where the highest traffic of city bikes was observed.

=== Airports ===
A civil airport, Białystok-Krywlany Airport, lies within the city limits, but does not provide regularly scheduled service. There were plans in 2011 to build a new regional airport, Białystok-Saniki Airport, that would have provided flights within Europe.

== Education ==
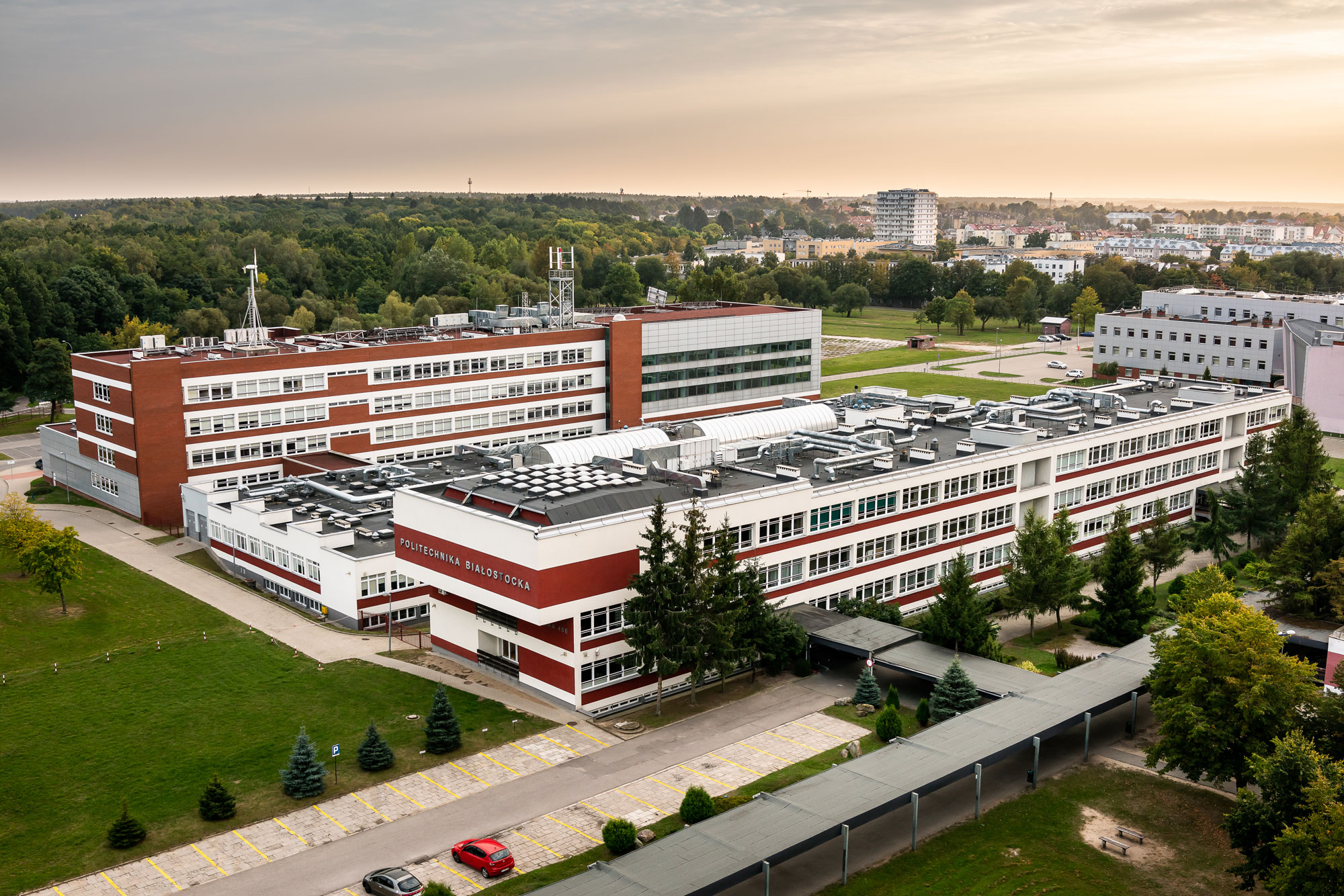
Campus of the Bialystok University of Technology

Higher education in the city can be traced back to the second half of the eighteenth century when the ownership of the city was inherited by Field Crown Hetman Jan Klemens Branicki. As a patron of the arts and sciences, Branicki encouraged numerous artists and scientists to settle in Białystok to take advantage of Branicki's patronage. In 1745 Branicki established Poland's first military college, the School of Civil and Military Engineering, in the city.

Since the fall of communism many privately funded institutions of higher educations have been founded and their number is still increasing. Currently Białystok is home to one principal public university (University of Białystok) and two other public specialist universities (Bialystok University of Technology and Medical University of Białystok). Some institutions, such as Musical Academy in Białystok, are branches of their parent institutions in other cities, usually in Warsaw.

== Notable residents ==
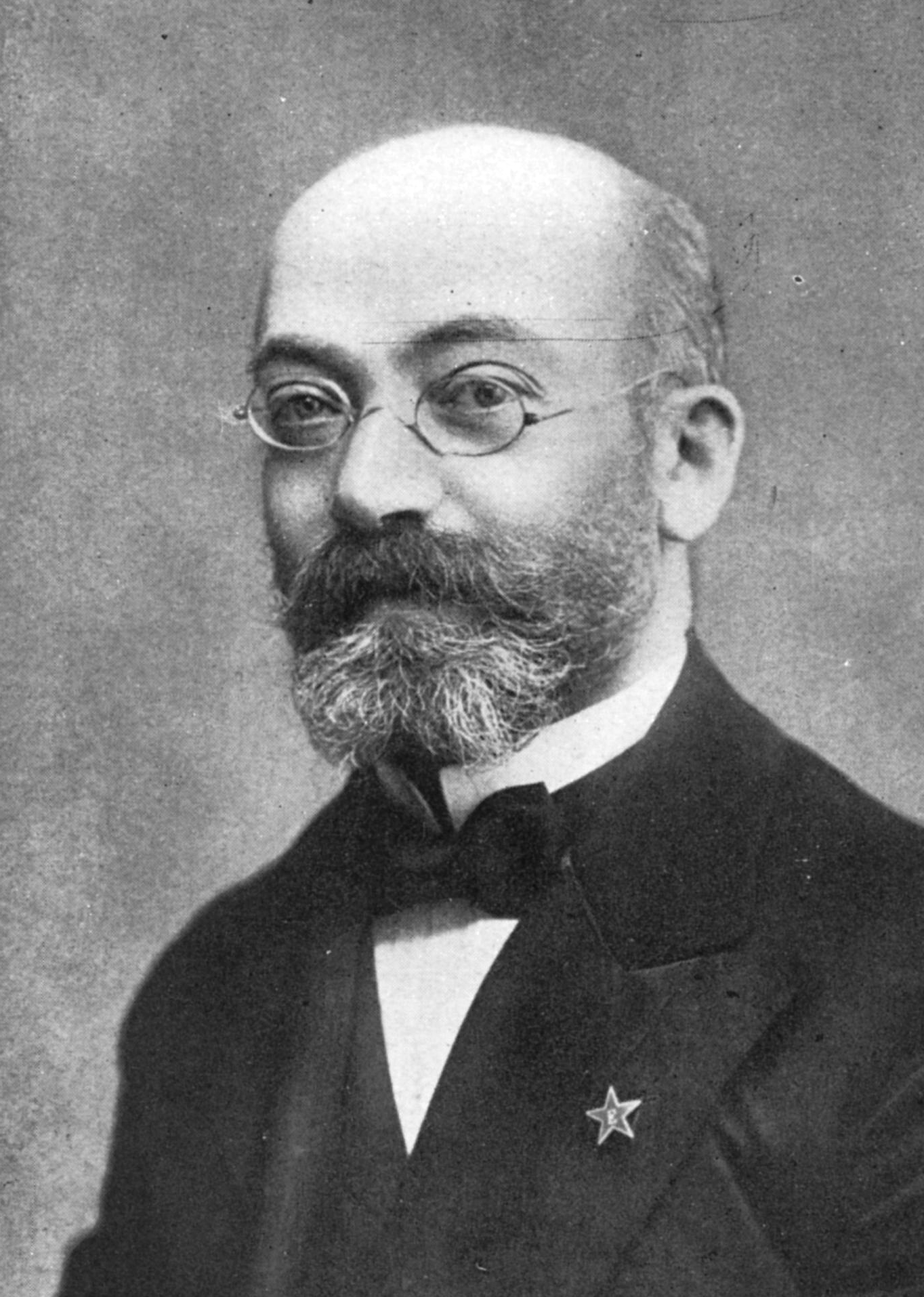
L. L. Zamenhof, the creator of Esperanto

Over the centuries, a number of people from Białystok have been prominent in the fields of science, language, politics, religion, sports, finance, visual arts and performing arts. This environment was created in the mid-eighteenth century by the patronage of Jan Klemens Branicki for the arts and sciences. These include Ryszard Kaczorowski, last émigré President of the Republic of Poland, L. L. Zamenhof, the creator of Esperanto, Albert Sabin, co-developer of the polio vaccine, Izabella Scorupco, actress, Max Weber, painter. Tomasz Bagiński illustrator, animator and director Oscar nominee in 2002 for The Cathedral. Leo Melamed pioneered creation of the International Monetary Market and financial futures.
