= Ryszard Gołębiewski =

Mayor of Białystok
- In office 3 August 1944 – 7 August 1944
- Preceded by: Seweryn Nowakowski (until 1939)
- Succeeded by: Witold Wenclik

Personal details
- Born: 1893 Białystok, Congress Poland
- Died: 1968 (aged 74–75) Szczecin, Polish People's Republic
- Education: Kyiv Institute of Commerce
- Profession: Politician, economist
- Awards: Cross of Merit

Ryszard Gołębiewski (born 1893 in Białystok, died 1968 in Szczecin) was a Polish official and economist, Home Army officer and underground activist during World War II. Following the German's departure from the city in the summer of 1944, he served as the Mayor of Białystok from August 3 to 7, 1944.

== Biography ==
Around 1912, he moved with his family to Kyiv, where he completed his studies in economics at the Kyiv Institute of Commerce. He fought in the Russian Civil War and the Polish–Soviet War, imprisoned several times. From 1920 to 1939, he worked as a department head at the Białystok city hall and ran unsuccessfully for mayor. In 1939, he participated in the September Campaign, after which he was taken prisoner by the Germans, from which he later escaped. He joined the Białystok District of the Home Army under the pseudonym "Andrzej II" and rose to the rank of captain. At the end of July 1944, he was sent by the Home Army for talks with representatives of the Red Army. From August 2/3 to August 7/8, 1944, he served as mayor of Białystok after being appointed in accordance with order issued by Józef Przybyszewski, the Government Delegation for Poland-appointed voivode. Shortly after the liberation, he, together with voivode Przybyszewski and representatives of the Home Army revealed themselves to the Soviet occupation authorities in the city. Gołębiewski had already appointed deputies and begun organizing departments within the office. When Gołębiowski tried to discuss city matters with Soviet garrison commandant, Georgy Zakharov, he was replied that he should speak directly to Leonard Borkowicz who is "the supreme authority" in the city. On August 8, he was arrested by the NKVD, after which he was imprisoned in Kharkov and imprisoned in the camp 170 Dyagilevo next to Ryazan. Being released in 1947, he returned to Białystok, then, fearing the security services, moved to Szczecin with his mother and worked as a clerk. He was buried in that city.

For his underground activities, he was awarded the Bronze and Silver Crosses of Merit with Swords. In 2017, he was commemorated with a commemorative plaque on the building of the Białystok City Hall.
