= Białystok Inspectorate (Home Army) =

Białystok Inspectorate of the Home Army
- Inspektorat Białostocki Armii Krajowej
- Active: 1939-1945
- Allegiance: Second Polish Republic
- Branch: Home Army
- Type: Underground
- Part of: Białystok District
- Garrison/HQ: Białystok
- Engagements: World War II

The Białystok Inspectorate of the Home Army (Polish: Inspektorat Białostocki Armii Krajowej) was the local structure of the Białystok District of the Home Army.

== Duties ==
The main tasks of the inspectorate included coordinating the work of districts, collecting and processing information sent by Areas headquarters and then forwarding it to the District Command, supervising sabotage actions, training military cadets etc. The inspectorate organized, among other, on the territory of Białystok-City Area a six-month officer cadet course for high school graduates from 1939-41 and for high school graduates from 1942, who had obtained their high school diplomas as part of secret education. There were also two courses of the non-commissioned officer school for reserve riflemen and for scouts from the Grey Ranks as well as sanitary courses for girls from the municipal branch of the Women Military Service, which Aniela Rybarczyk, a pre-war teacher at a teachers' seminary organized. The inspectorate, together with the District Government Delegate also organized the civil assistance. In 1943 both of these institutions managed the assistance for the Bialystok Ghetto. Based on the district headquarters' guidelines, plans were prepared to seize the most important facilities in the inspectorate's territory. In April 1944, the Białystok Inspectorate's additional duties included identifying the current locations of German radio stations and determining how many Home Army soldiers had radiotelegraphy training (they could transmit and receive at a rate of over 50 characters per minute).

== Organizational structure in 1944 ==
The Białystok-city Area together with the districts of Białystok-county and Sokółka was part of the 5th inspectorate whose staff at the beginning of 1944 included Władysław Kaufman "Boguslaw", deputy inspector for training, mjr Marian Walter "Zadora", adjutant sierz. pochor. Marian Wolniewicz "Karol" The inspectorate was divided to several districts encompassing districts with one district dedicated to the city of Białystok:

- Inspectorate Headquarters
- Białystok-city Area
- Białystok-county Area
- Sokółka Area

=== Białystok-city Area (from of September 1944 as an inspectorate) ===
The Białystok-city Area (Polish: Obwód Białystok-miasto) was responsible for the city of Białystok during its occupation. It was headed by a commander who was assisted by a staff. 16 sub-units were subordinated to them based on geographical location: Wygoda, Bojary, Pieczurki, Skorupy, Dojlidy, Pietrasze, Nowe Miasto, Bażantarnia, Zwierzyniec, Białostoczek, Piaski, Marczuk, Antoniuk, Bacieczki, Śródmieście and Słoboda. In the fourth quarter of 1943, the city district showed 6 full and 11 skeleton platoons, and in them 7 officers, 22 cadets, 296 non-commissioned officers and 594 privates.

The Białystok-city district could count among its successes the abduction on November 1, 1942, of members of the AK District staff from Gestapo headquarters at 15 Kochstrasse (Sienkiewicza) street, the liquidation in March 1943 of the German intelligence cell, the burning of the Aeitsamt files on the night of May 27-June 28, 1943. In 1944 the unit was involved in a try to release Polish prisoners intended to be sent to forced labour in Germany from a transition camp located at Żółtkowska Avenue. Józef Świrniak, the intelligence commander of the Bialystok-city Area was tasked to bribe the Gestapo with money collected from donation, and talks took place on April 27, 1944, in the office of the Gestapo at the transition camp. The discussions prolonged and on 20:00 when the curfew began, the Gestapo offered to escort Świrniak home. He was betrayed by the Polish liaison working at the camp and at Lipowa Street near St. Roch's Church he was arrested by the Gestapo and died by taking a pill.

==== Commanders ====
- Witalis Kostecki "Witek" (zabity przez NKWD w III 1941 r.)
- Franciszek Szabunia "Zemsta" (do VII 1941 r.)
- Stefan Fjałkowski "Młotek" (od 1 IX 1941 do 28 II 1942)
- Przemysław Halwaty "Bron" (od III 1942)
- Michał Dziejma "Boruta" (od I 1943 do 7 XI 1943, arrested)
- Przemysław Halwaty "Bron" (od IV kwartału 1943)
- Jozef Niwinski "Paprzyca" (od IV 1943 do IV 1944 r.)
- Czesław Hakke "Filip" (od IV 1944 r. at that time already as a captain).

==== Headquarters structure in 1944 ====
- Czesław Hakke "Filip", commander, arrested on September 1st
- por. Jan Wyrzykowski "Murat", 1st deputy commander
- ppor. cz.w. Kazimierz Wojtasz "Osowiecki", 2nd deputy commander
- Adiutant: Mieczysław Wojtukiewicz "Cygan" (arrested on September 2)
- Quartermaster: ppor. rez. Leon Bonia "Jozef II"
- Head of supply: ppor. cz. w. Kazimierz Wojtasz "Osowiecki"
- Head of Kedyw: ppor. Henryk Powichrowski "Leński"
- Head of Intelligence: Jozef Sapieżko "Reduta" (arrested in May 1944, position fuilfilled by Ludwik Sikorski "Wiktor", himself arrested on August 26)
- Head of Communications: Henryk Babicki "Babicz"
- Head of sappering: Jan Wyrzykowski "Murat"
- Head of arms: Jan Malyszko "Wiktor"
- Head of Women Military Service: Aniela Rybarczyk "Aleksandra"
