= Augustyn Mirys =

Polish painter

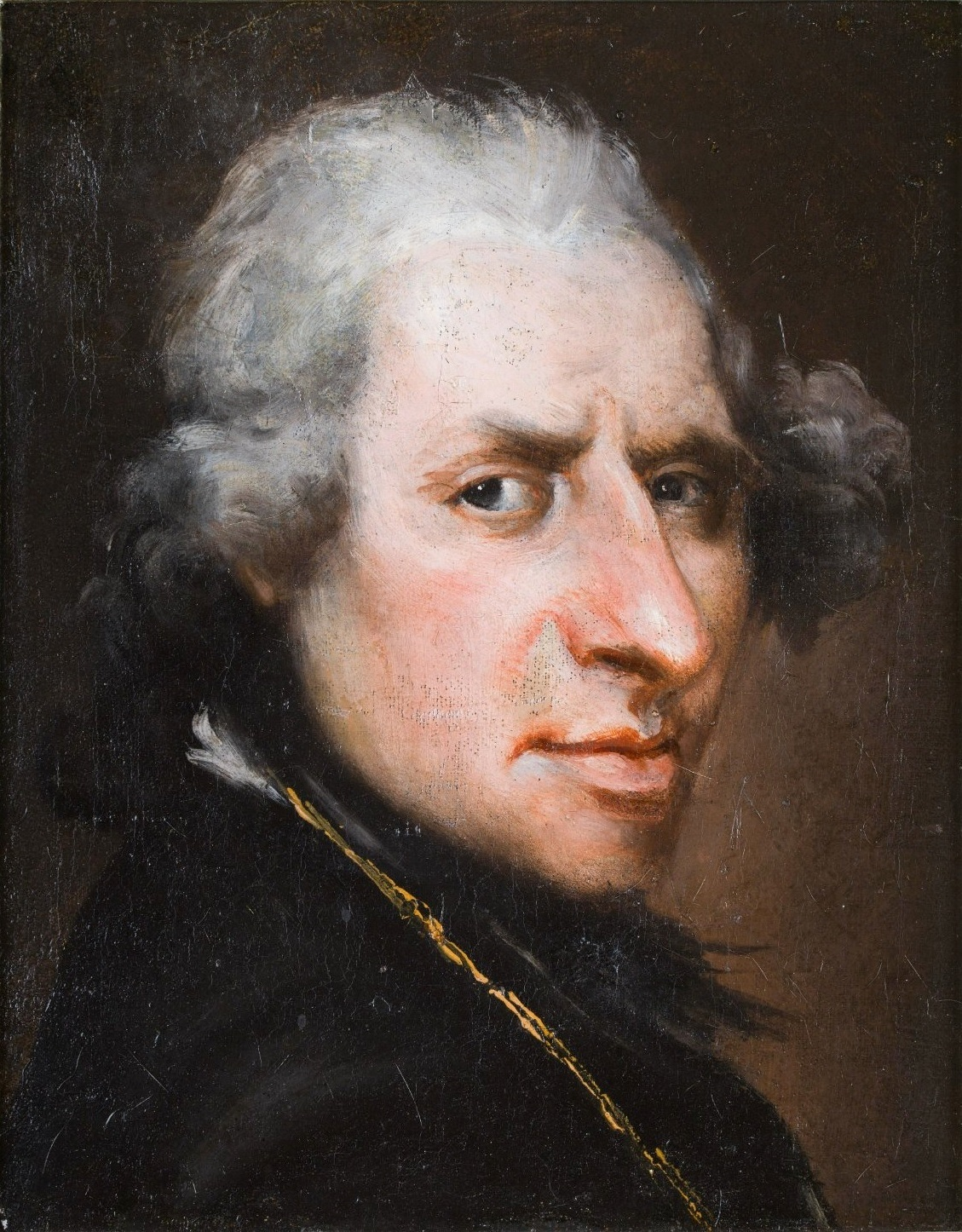
Autoportait, c. 1750

Augustyn Mirys (8 January 1700 – 8 March 1790) was a Polish painter of Scottish-French origin.

Augustyn was born probably in France and educated in Rome. There in 1739 he met a Polish aristocrat Jan Kajetan Jabłonowski and moved to the Polish–Lithuanian Commonwealth. In Poland he worked for the Jabłonowskis, the Cetners, the Krasińskis and marechal Franciszek Bieliński. In early 1750s he entered the service of Jan Klemens Branicki and moved to his private town: Białystok. He was later granted an indygenat, which meant he held by law all the privileges granted to Polish nobles. He died in Nowe Miasto near Białystok. Mirys worked mainly in oil and pastel. He was active as a portraitist and a decorator. He had a son Silvestre David Mirys (1750-1810), who became a painter and illustrator active in France.
