= Fundusz Obrony Morskiej =

Polish naval fundraising venture

Fundusz Obrony Morskiej (FOM, English: Maritime Defence Fund) was a fund-raising venture, created by the Polish government on January 20, 1933, out of a previous fund, Komitet Floty Narodowej (Committee of National Fleet). Its purpose was expansion of Polish Navy, and the Fund collected money for it, both in Poland, and abroad, among Poles living abroad. The money was collected through local offices of the Maritime and Colonial League, and first director of the FOM was General Kazimierz Sosnkowski.

First collections took place in February 1934; within more than three years (until October 1937), the FOM gathered about 8 million zlotys. The money was spent on construction of Poland's first submarine, ORP Orzeł, and the success of the FOM prompted President Ignacy Mościcki into creation of a twin organization, National Defence Fund (1936). FOM was active until outbreak of World War II – until February 1939, it collected additional 2,5 million zlotys.
