= Białystok Detention Center =

Prison in Białystok, Poland

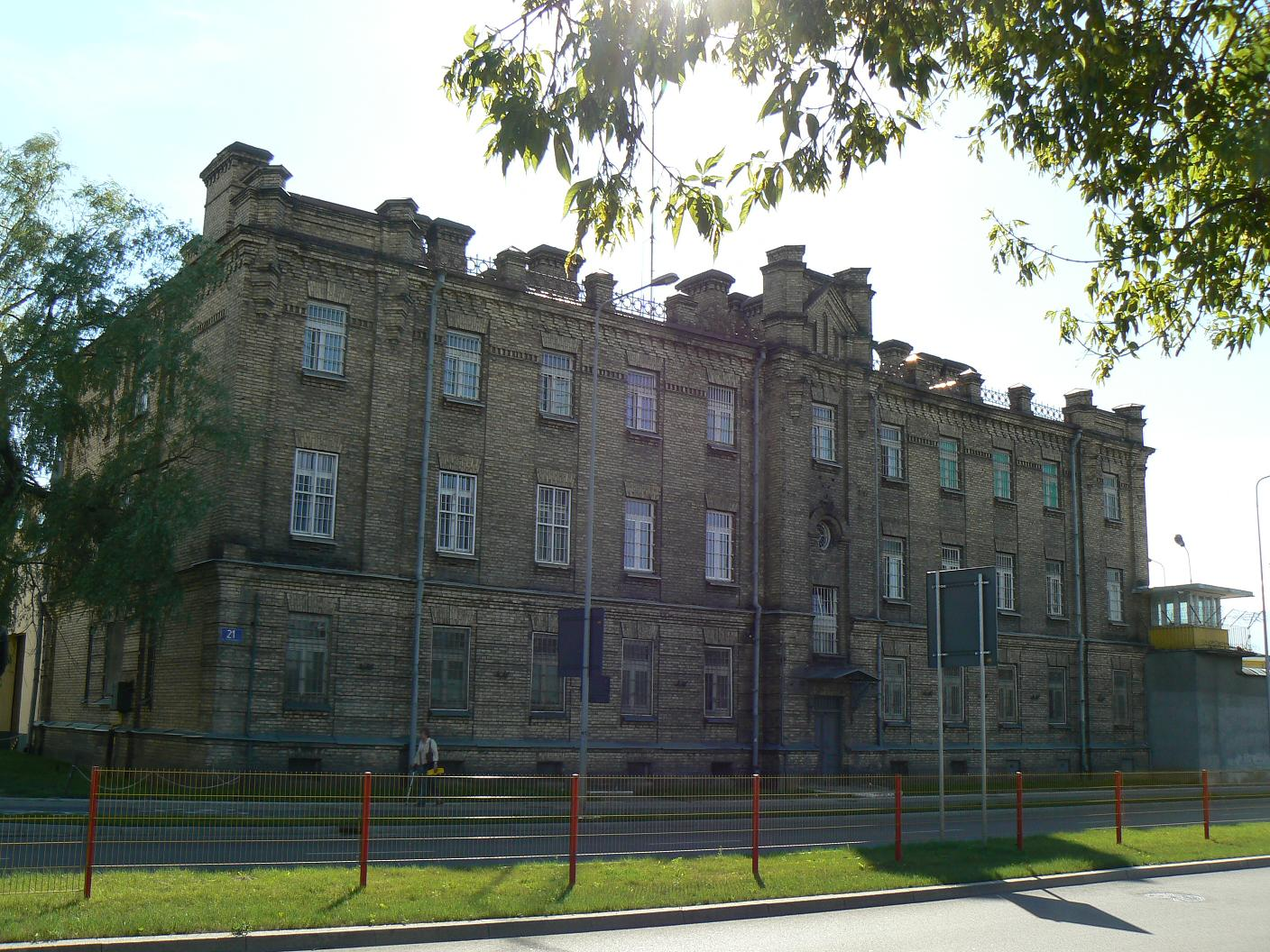
- Interactive map of Białystok Detention Center
- Location: Bema District, Białystok, Poland; 53°07′25″N 23°08′26″E
- Status: Active
- Opened: 1906
- Managed by: Polish Prison Service

The Białystok Detention Center (Polish: Areszt Śledczy w Białymstoku) is a detention center and prison in Kopernika street, Bema District of Białystok, capital of Podlaskie Voivodeship.

== History ==
This prison complex was built in 1911–1912. When constructed, the facility was located on the outskirts of the city, currently surrounded by residential district. It was used first by Tsarist Russia, and in 1915–1919 by the Germans. In the interwar period, it was administered by the Polish authorities. During World War II, it was managed first by the Soviets, and then by the Germans. The Germans, retreating from the city in July 1944, mined the facility.

Following the end of the war and the integration of Białystok into the newly established Polish People's Republic, it was reopened on September 10, 1944. At that time, it served as a penal-investigation and class prison. In the autumn and winter of 1944/1945, the prison was protected by NKVD units, and some of its premises were given over to the counterintelligence SMERSH of the 2nd Belorussian Front. During this period, prisoners were brought to the prison, from whom transports were then formed to Soviet camps. By the end of January 1945, about 5 thousand people had been deported from the prison to the Soviet Union. After the end of mass deportations, the single-cell section of the Białystok prison was taken over by NKVD officers, who handed it over to the Investigation Department of the WUBP in Białystok in the summer of 1945.

In the common room of the administrative building of the prison in Białystok, court hearings were held, during which various sentences were passed, including the death penalty. These sentences, in most cases, were carried out on the premises. In the years 1944–1956, over 250 death sentences were carried out in the prison. Almost until the end of 1945, convicts were shot with automatic weapons in the prison yard by two UB officers. A dozen or so people died in this way. In 1946, most of the hundred or so executions were carried out by three masked executioners, probably local UB officers, supervised by an employee of the Investigation Department of the WUBP - the commander of the execution squad. Probably already at that time, some sentences were carried out with a single shot to the back of the head. From the turn of 1946/1947 the sentences were carried out by individual executioners - prison officers using handguns (the so-called Katyn method), in the same basement of the administrative building. The facility's highest population in post-war period took place in 1950, when it held about two thousands prisoners.

From 1955 it was used as a central prison. After October Thaw in 1956, the facility housed the Central Prison, then the Investigation Detention Center, the Provincial Board of Penal Institutions, and finally the Investigation Detention Center again, which has been operating to this day. After martial law was introduced in December 1981, it was used to hold interned opposition members. In 2002, the complex was entered into the register of historical monuments.
