= Białystok-Krywlany Airfield =

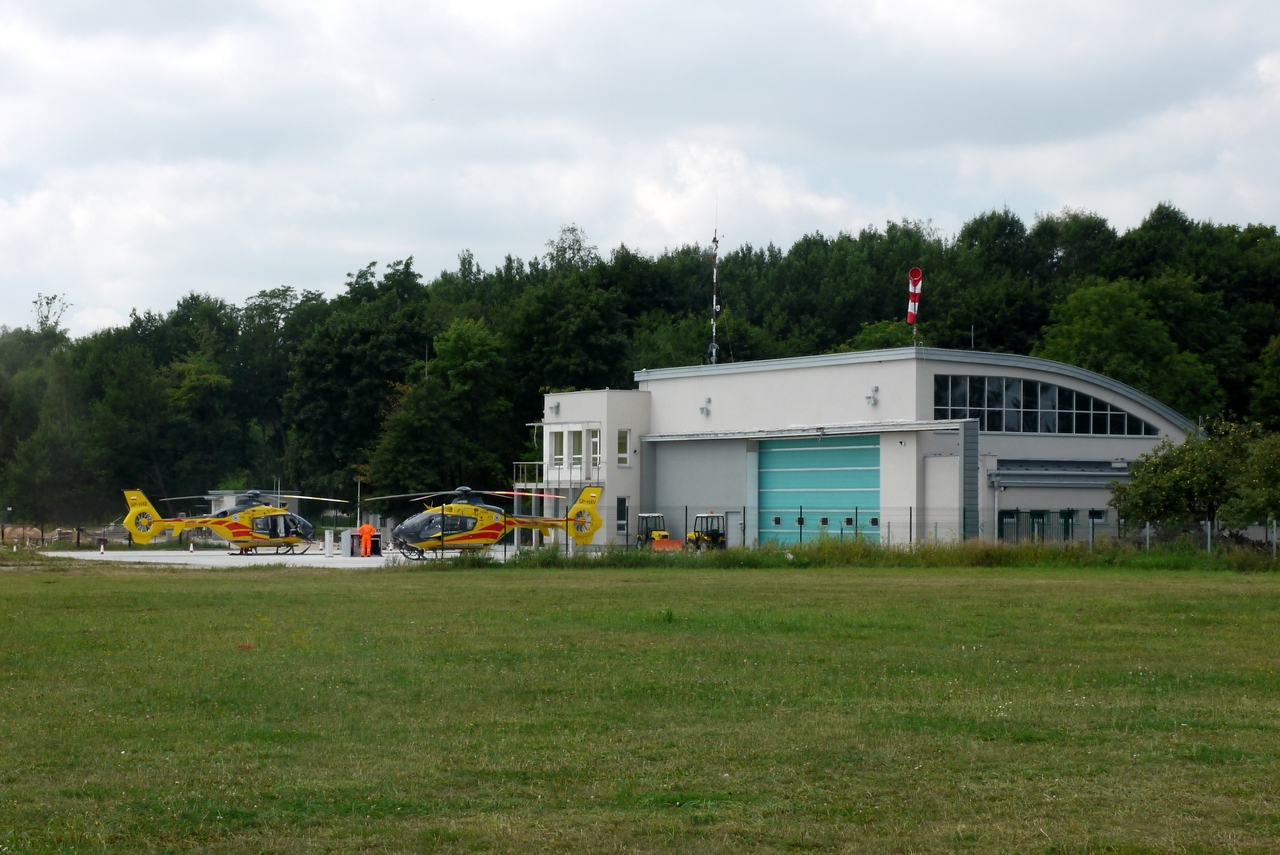
- Podlaskie headquarters of the Air Rescue Service at the airfield
- IATA: none; ICAO: EPBK

Summary
- Airport type: Public
- Operator: Aeroklub Polski (Aeroklub Białystok)
- Serves: Białystok
- Location: Białystok, Poland
- Elevation AMSL: 502 ft / 153 m
- Coordinates: 53°06′8.1678″N 23°10′13.7388″E

Map
- Location of aerodrome in Poland

Runways
Direction	Length		Surface
Direction	ft	m	Surface
09R/27L		1,350	Asphalt concrete
09L/27R		840	grass

Białystok-Krywlany Airfield (ICAO: EPBK) is a general aviation aerodrome in Białystok, Poland.

== History ==
The selection of the area for a new airfield occurred on February 19, 1930, on the premises of the Provincial Committee of the Airborne and Antigas Defence League on Warszawska Street. A representative of the Department of Aerospace, Engineer Hennenberg, presented four alternatives for the location of the airfield, indicating the area situated between the property Dojlidy and forest west of the farm Krywlany. After three years of negotiations, a decision was made. In 1935, the first hangar facilities and buildings were built. The airfield served as a backup landing base for the fifth Aviation Regiment in Lida. Shortly before the outbreak of World War II, lighting was installed for night flights and construction started on a concrete runway. At the onset of World War II, air squadron of the Independent Operational Group Narew was based at the airport, engaging in air battles with the German Air Force. During the city's occupation, the airport was used by the Soviet, and then German occupation authorities. The 41st Fighter Aviation Regiment of the 9th Mixed Air Division stationed at the airfield. The Soviet authorities expanded and developed the infrastructure at the airport and around it. On January 8, 1940, regular passenger air connections on the route Moscow-Minsk-Białystok-Königsberg-Gdańsk-Berlin were launched. The flights were operated by the Soviet airline Aeroflot using Lisunov Li-2 aircraft and the German airline Deutsche Luft Hansa using Junkers Ju 52. Shortly before the Germans evacuation the city, they blew up the warehouses, workshops, fuel stations and hangars and finally, planes bombed the runway.

=== Post-war activity 1945-onwards ===
Shortly after the war, the Białystok Branch of the LOT Polish Airlines was created. On 30 April 1945, airlines began flying routes every week on Mondays, Wednesdays, and Fridays using Douglas DC-3 aircraft. The flight from Białystok to Warsaw lasted 50 minutes and tickets cost 400 zł. This service was quickly discontinued. Since that time the airfield has not seen regular service, with only gliders utilizing the grounds. During the mid-'80s border guards stationed helicopters and light aircraft at the airport, in addition to a helicopter ambulance.

=== Passenger airport extension ===
New plans have been announced to extend and modernize the airport, including the addition of a new runway to offer a passenger airline service. This led to a referendum in 2017. The referendum was held 15 January 2017, with 96% of the voters showing support for a new regional airport. Turnout was just 12.96%, not enough for the results to be considered binding. The majority of voters were inhabitants of Białystok.

== Bibliography ==
- Lehmann, Ernst A.; Mingos, Howard. 1927. The Zeppelins. The Development of the Airship, with the Story of the Zeppelin Air Raids in the World War. Published by I. H. SEARS & COMPANY, Inc. New York International Clearinghouse for Hydrogen Based Commerce - Zepplins (online chapters I to VII)

== See also ==
- List of airports in Poland
- List of airports in Poland with unpaved runways
- List of airports
- Air ambulances in Poland
