= Mickiewicza Street, Białystok =

Street in Białystok, Poland

Mickiewicza Street
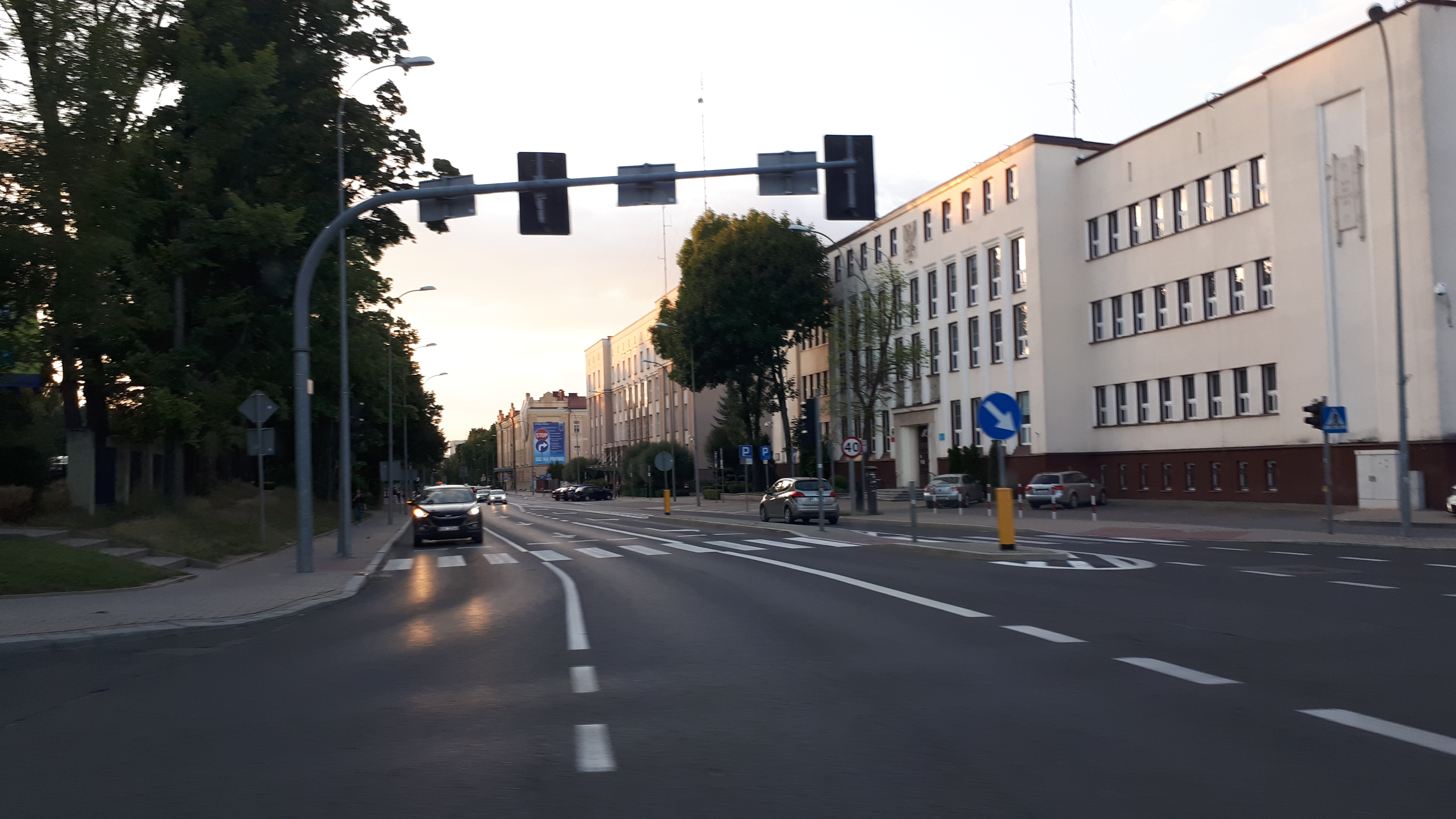
- Interactive map of Mickiewicza Street
- Native name: Ulica Adama Mickiewicza (Polish)
- Former name(s): Brzeska, Puszkinska
- Type: Street
- Length: 5.5 km (18,000 ft)
- Location: Centrum and Mickiewicza districts, Białystok
- Coordinates: 53°06′28″N 23°11′00″E

Adama Mickiewicza Street (Polish: Ulica Adama Mickiewicza) is a major street and thoroughfare running from the center of the city of Białystok.

== History ==
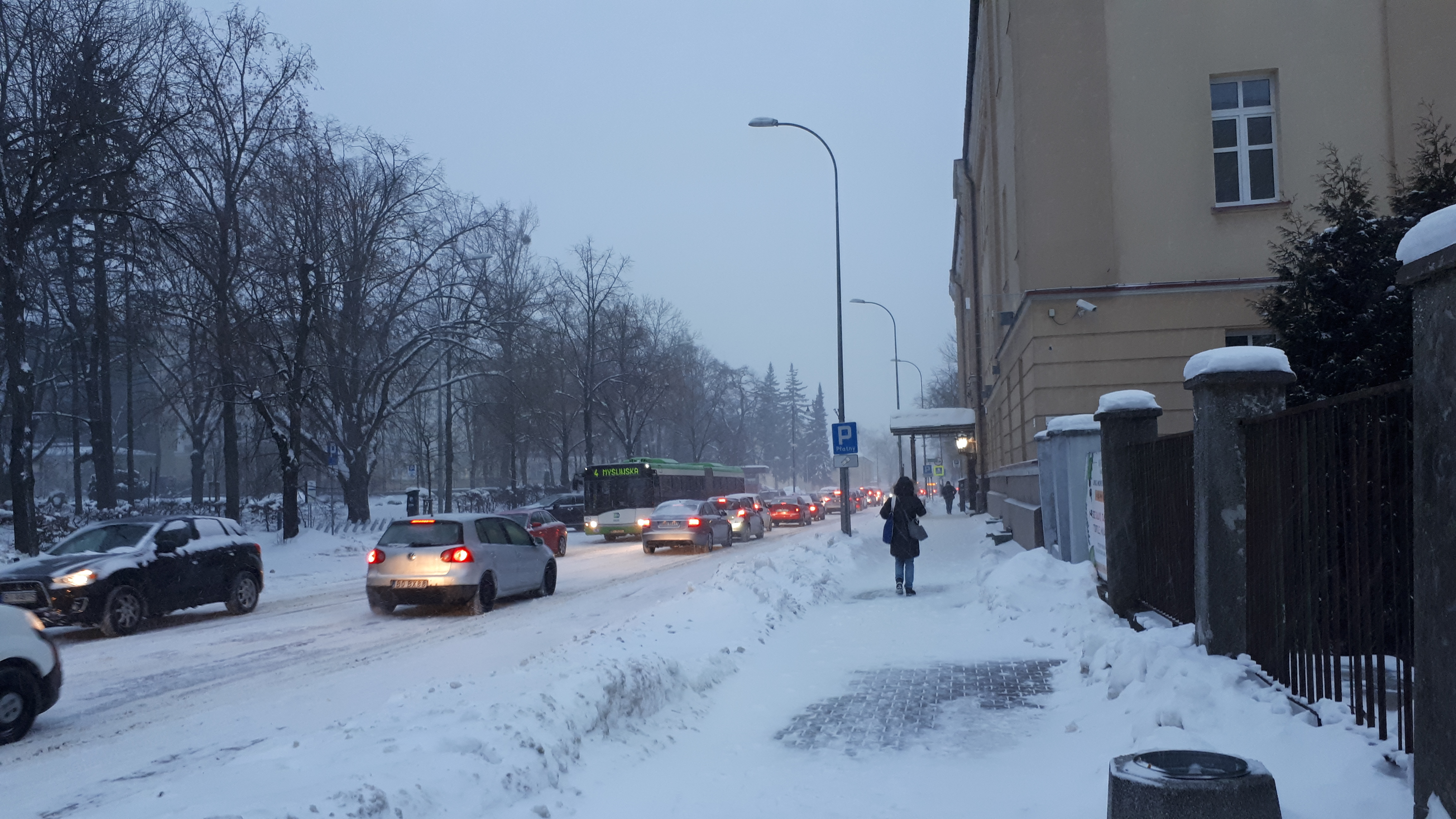
View of the street, February 2021

The oldest traces of Mickiewicza Street can be found in the 16th century. At that time, it was a route leading from Zabłudów towards the Wiesiolowski manor and the parish church in Białystok. Until the end of the 17th century, this road was marked out in a straight line. In the first half of the 18th century, it changed its course due to the reconstruction of the Branicki Palace. Two courtyards were created in front of the palace and the previously straight road took on a characteristic bend, running along the palace fence. It then lost its character as a public road in the part that entered the palace and park area. At the intersection with Świętojańska Street, a gate was placed, closing access to the Danieli Menagerie. Communication with the city was therefore via Świętojańska Street and then Warszawska Street. The remaining section of today's Mickiewicza Street, after crossing the gate to Zwierzyniec, passed through the farm buildings and next to the Field of Mars (currently Poniatowski Park), which was the training ground for Jan Klemens Branicki's military regiment. In the 19th century, when the entire surroundings of the hetman's residence were liquidated, this street ran along the fence of the palace courtyards. In the interwar period, it was given a representative appearance. It became the axis of a separate sector, in which buildings related to the functioning of the state administration were erected. As in the case of other streets in Białystok, its name changed many times. In the 19th century, the Russian-controlled authorities called it Puszkinska. This name referred to the section running from the palace gate to the intersection with Świętojańska Street.

== Notable buildings ==
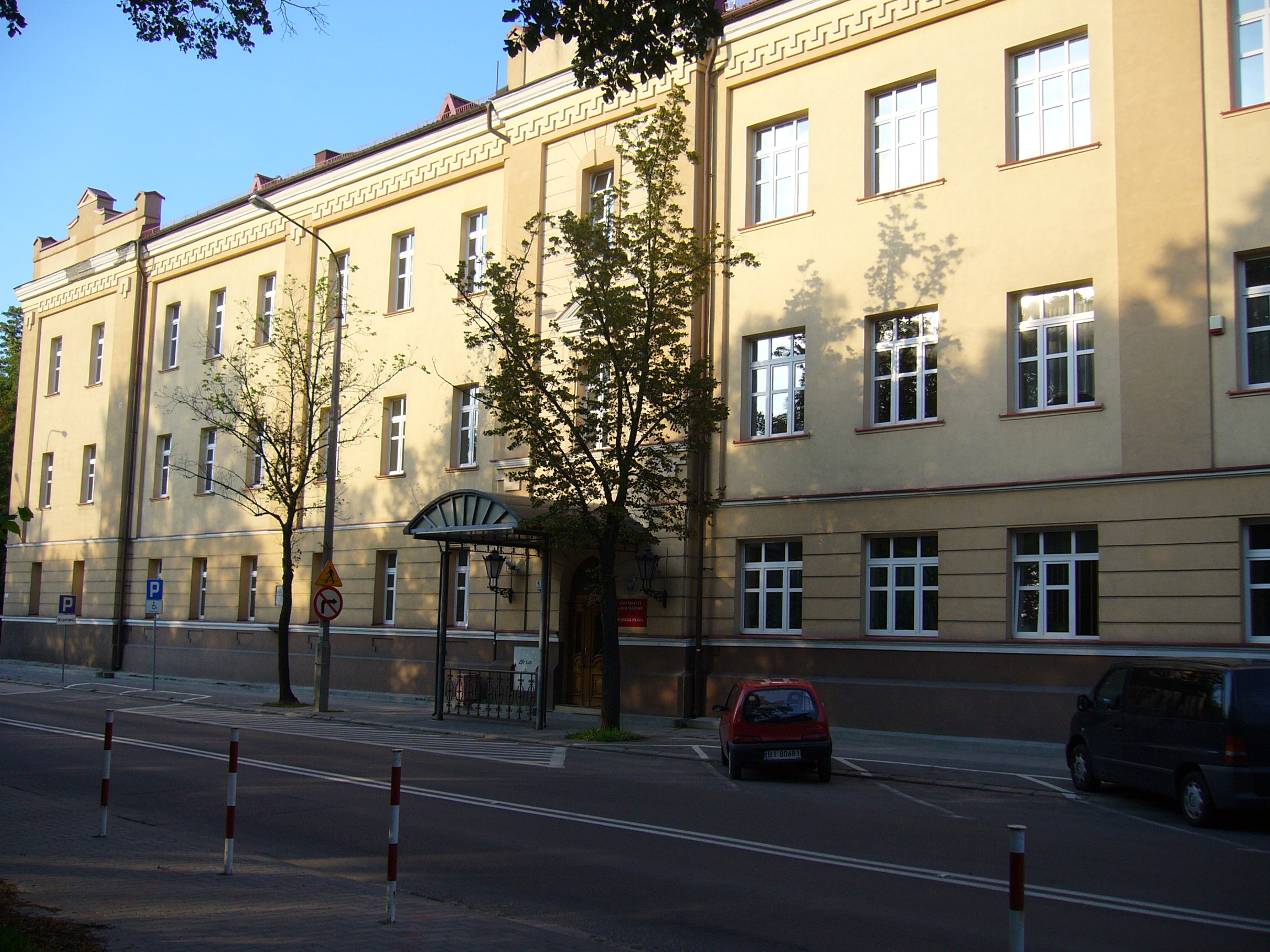
Faculty of Law at Mickiewicza 1 street

- Mickiewicza 1 - In 1897, the Mikołajewsko-Aleksandrów Girls' Gymnasium was founded in Białystok. Its building was erected by the Białystok construction company of Antoni Roleder. In 1919, the gymnasium was nationalized and operated as the State Girls' Gymnasium named after Princess Anna Jabłonowska, née Sapieha. In 1941, the school building was partially destroyed. In the preserved part, the Germans established a war hospital. In 1944, the entire central body of the building was damaged by a bomb explosion. In 1945, the Pedagogical High School was given a place to be located in the surviving rooms of the wing of the building from Elektryczna Street. It also conducted training courses for teachers. In 1946 the school building was rebuilt. In 1955 the Teacher Training College was established in Białystok, which was additionally located in this building. In 1959 the Pedagogical High School moved out of this building and received a new seat on Świerkowa Street (currently the Faculty of Pedagogy and Psychology is located here). Due to the improvement in the housing situation, the Teacher Training College was able to develop its activities. In 1968, among other things, a branch of the University of Warsaw was established on its basis. Today the building houses the Department of Law of the university.

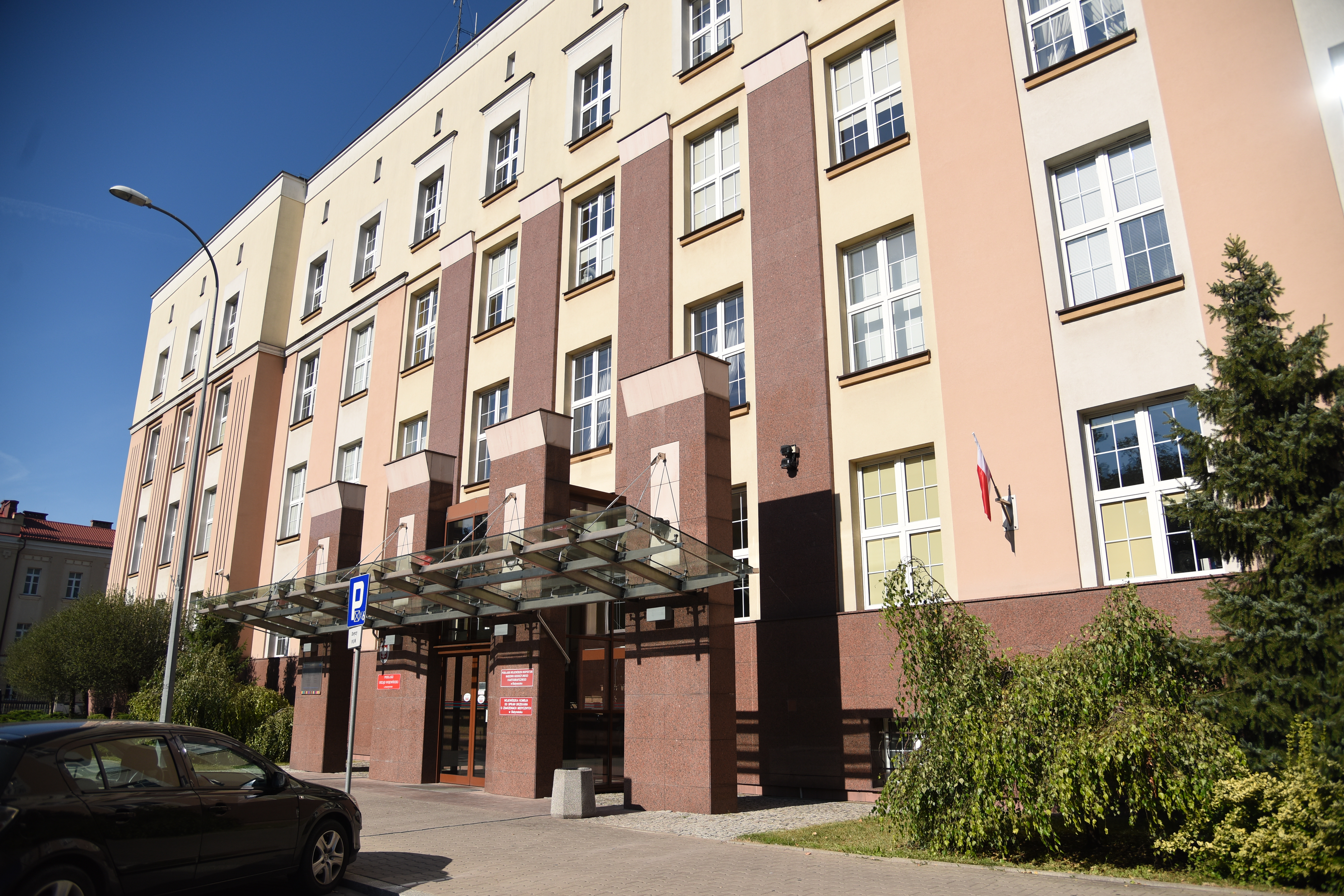
Seat of the Podlaskie Voivodeship Office

- Mickiewicza 3 - This building was erected in the years 1928-1930 for the purpose of housing the Fiscal Chamber in Białystok. The initial design by engineer W. Kołkowski assumed the construction of a building with classicist features. For unknown reasons, it was not implemented. Commissioned by the Directorate of Public Works, a new design was prepared by Warsaw architect, Kazimierz Tołłoczko. His implementation was in line with the trend of so-called office constructivism. Presumably, he redesigned the front wall of the Tax Chamber, wanting to unify the appearance of both buildings. On February 10, 1930, the Tax Chamber building was officially opened. In 1939, with the Soviet occupation of the city, this building was the seat of the NKVD. In 1944, the building was slightly damaged by Soviet bombing. After reconstruction, it housed the Voivodeship National Council and the Voivodeship Office. In the 1960s, a floor was added, distorting the shape of the building. A few years later, the buildings of the former Fiscal Chamber and the District Court were connected by a pavilion, which houses a conference room. In 2005, the building underwent a general renovation.
- Mickiewicza 7 - The District Court building was built in the years 1928-1931 according to the design of Kazimierz Tołłoczko. In 1939, similarly to the neighbouring building, the NKVD also nested here ominously. In the basements, there are still a few preserved cells in which the torturers held their victims. In 1944, this building was damaged by bombing. After the damage was repaired, it housed the Voivodeship Office.
