= Zielona, Gmina Grabówka =

Zielona
- Village
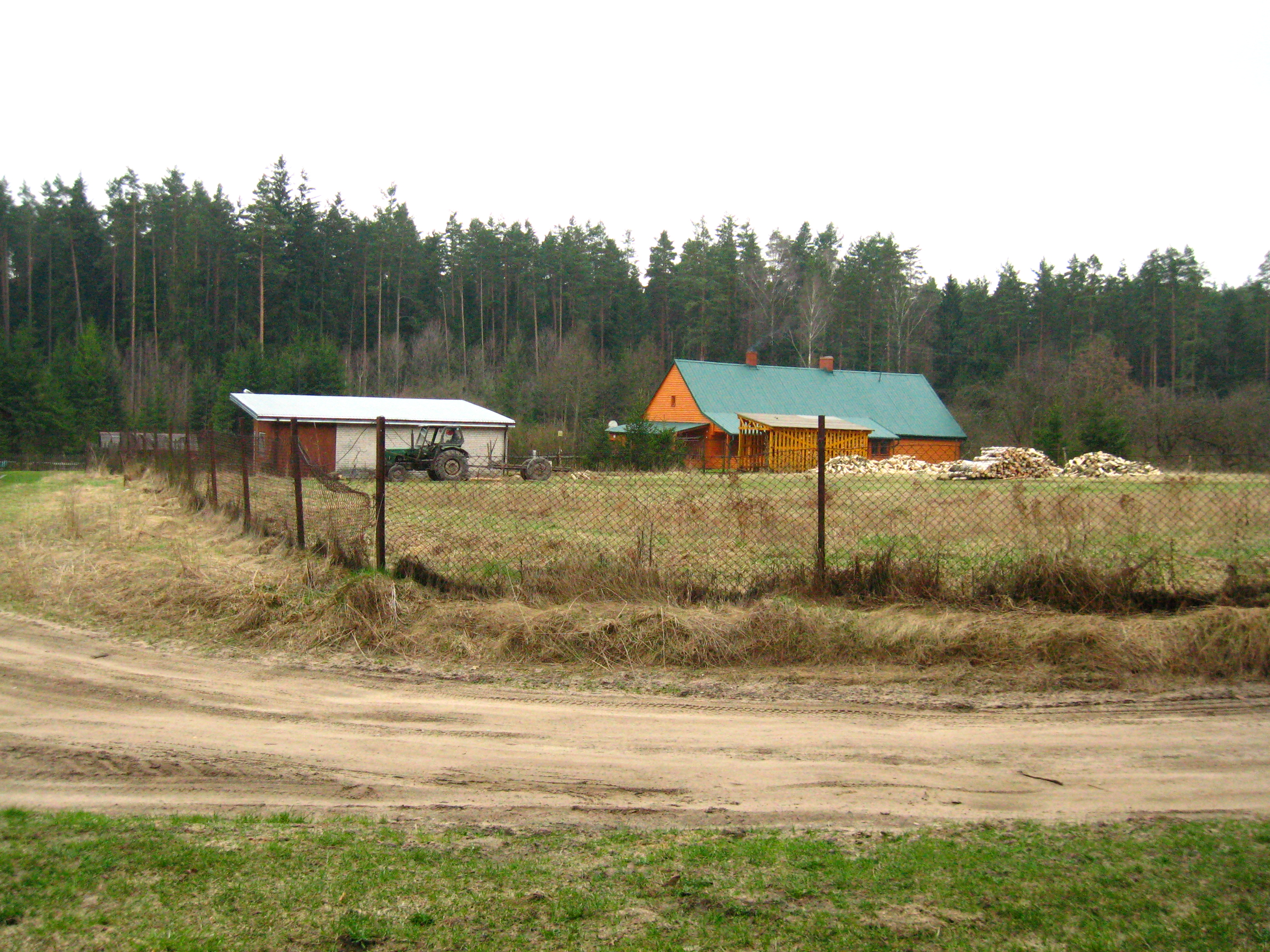

- Location within Poland
- Coordinates: 53°9′7″N 23°18′20″E
- Country: Poland
- Voivodeship: Podlaskie
- County: Białystok
- Gmina: Grabówka

Zielona [ʑɛˈlɔna] is a village in the administrative district of Gmina Grabówka, within Białystok County, Podlaskie Voivodeship, in north-eastern Poland. Until January 2025 it was part of Gmina Supraśl.
