= Józef Przybyszewski =

Polish politician

Voivode of Białystok Voivodeship
- In office 1944–1944
- Preceded by: Occupation (Henryk Ostaszewski until 1939)
- Succeeded by: Jerzy Sztachelski

Personal details
- Born: 28 October 1909 Grajewo, Congress Poland
- Died: 9 July 1972 (aged 65) Warsaw, Polish People's Republic
- Resting place: Powązki Cemetery
- Citizenship: Poland
- Education: University of Wrocław
- Occupation: Politician

Józef Przybyszewski (28 October 1906 - 9 July 1972; Pseudonym "Grzymała") was a Polish politician who served for a short period in 1944 as the Voivode of Białystok Voivodeship.

== Biography ==
He was born on October 28, 1906, in Grajewo. He passed his secondary school leaving examination in Grajewo in 1927. Afterwards, he studied at the Jagiellonian University and at the seminary of the Częstochowa diocese. With the onset of World War II, he fought in the defense of Warsaw.

During the occupation, he was active in the underground Supreme Court and the National Military Organization.

In October 1943, he was nominated by the Supreme Court as District Government Delegate in Białystok, where he left in November. However, he soon returned to Warsaw due to illness. He returned to the Białystok region at the turn of May and June 1944 and resumed his duties as District Government Delegate in Białystok.

On July 27, 1944, Soviet troops entered Białystok after which Józef Przybyszewski revealed his position as voivode to them and resumed his duties. For the first time, Józef Przybyszewski as voivode, the Delegate of the Government-in-Exile, signed an official document using his real name. This marked the beginning of the Polish Underground State civil administration’s attempt to assert power. In a proclamation issued the same day, Przybyszewski declared that the legitimate authority in the voivodeship belonged to the Government of the Republic of Poland and that his directives were binding for all civilians. He affirmed that the Home Army remained the only armed force acting on behalf of the Polish nation and appointed Ryszard Gołębiowski as the Mayor of Białystok.

On August 7, 1944, he was arrested by the Soviets and transported to Moscow. He was later imprisoned in Kharkov and Diagilev Camp, from where he returned to Poland in 1947. He died in 1972 in Warsaw and was buried at the Powazki Cemetery.
