= Fundusz Obrony Narodowej =

Fundusz Obrony Narodowej ("National Defense Fund") was an attempt by both the government of the Second Polish Republic and the Polish nation to collect funds necessary for improving fighting ability of the Polish Army before the increasingly likely World War II.

== Background ==
When Poland regained independence in the fall of 1918, the most important task was to create from scratch armed forces of the fledgling republic. Surrounded by hostile neighbors, Poland managed to recover from several conflicts, but the government in Warsaw was well aware that sooner or later there would be new wars.

Several historians claim that Marshall Józef Piłsudski and his obsolete notions hampered the development of the Polish Army. Pilsudski was not interested in armored forces and aircraft, he emphasized the importance of cavalry and infantry instead. After his death in 1935, the new Marshall, Edward Rydz-Śmigły immediately decided to start a huge project of modernization of the Army. However, the budget was too tight to cover the gigantic costs. Thus, the idea of the National Defense Fund was born.

== Creation ==
The Fund was created on April 9, 1936 by a special decree of President Ignacy Mościcki. Its purpose was to collect additional sources of money, necessary for supplying deficiencies in the military equipment of the Polish Army. Means were acquired in different ways, chiefly these were:

- selling of state-owned land, controlled by the military,
- endowments from state treasury (mostly based on a loan from France),
- gifts from both private individuals and private institutions.

The response of the nation was immense. Altogether, FON collected around 1 billion zlotys, out of which almost zl 40 million were made by various gifts from the nation. Patriotic citizens of the whole country would give their personal savings, children in schools gave their pocket money, in numerous cases people gave their jewellery, precious coins, gold earrings, plates, utensils and anything precious they had in their homes.

In several documented cases members of national minorities joined the action. In the town of Krzeszowice, Jews made in 1938 some 17% of the population, but they provided some 36% of money and valuables. Also, many celebrities helped with collection. According to Polish music expert Boguslaw Kaczynski, in 1938 and 1939 Jan Kiepura, a famous singer, gave permission for his name to be used on collection boxes. Apart from individuals, several companies helped. Among others, a famous radio factory Elektrit, sponsored in 1937 a RWD-10 airplane.

Money was collected not only in Poland - on October 1, 1936 Theophil Starzynski, President of The Polish Falcons of America called for help raise American money in support of the military equipment needs of Poland, threatened by Nazi Germany. Also, Poles from Yugoslavia collected by June 1939 the amount of 380,118 dinars.

Polish government divided everything into two groups - cash money and other items. The money was immediately used for purchases of arms and ammunition, distributed to several divisions of the Army. Usually, locals would support their own garrison - e.g. in 1938 children from Elementary School Number 6 in Płock collected money for a machine gun, presented to the Płock garrison. According to professor Wojciech Roszkowski, in the years 1936-1939 about 3 million Poles provided the Fund with their money or valuables.

== World War II and its aftermath ==
In September 1939, with the fall of Poland imminent after several weeks of hostilities (see: Polish September Campaign) such items as jewelry, gold and silver were taken to France, by minister and diplomat Waclaw Jedrzejewicz as well as other members of the government. Also, during the war, money and valuables were collected among Polish communities of United States and Canada.

In 1945 the Polish government in exile in London decided that FON sources would be used to help members of the disbanded Armia Krajowa. Two years later, the so-called "Committee of the Three" (General Stanisław Tatar, Colonels Marian Utnik and Stanisław Nowicki), who administered the fund, decided to send it back to Communist-controlled Poland. Until March 1948 it was overseen by the Ministry of Treasury, then passed to the National Bank of Poland. In 1951 parts of it (around 122 kilograms) were smelted into gold bars; fate of some of them is still unknown. What remains, are silver gifts, which are now stored in the Royal Castle in Warsaw.
