= Białystok District (Home Army) =

Białystok District of the Home Army
- Okręg Białystok Armii Krajowej
- Active: 1939-1945
- Allegiance: Second Polish Republic
- Branch: Home Army
- Type: Underground
- Part of: Home Army General Command
- Garrison/HQ: Białystok
- Engagements: World War II

Białystok District of the Home Army (Polish: Okręg Białystok Armii Krajowej; previously of SZP, ZWZ, and finally the Home Army), codenamed "Lin", "Czapla", "Pełnia", "Sarna", "Maślanki" was a major territorial unit of the Home Army which was responsible for territories which encompassed Białystok Voivodeship.

== Overview ==
In October 1939, Lieutenant "Prus" established contact with a group organized by Major Antoni Marecki, who arrived in Białystok at the end of September and, supported by the military families of the 42nd Infantry Regiment, in which he had once served, began his conspiratorial activities. Major Marecki (Antoni Iglewski, "Antoni", "Nieczuja") subordinated himself to Lieutenant Colonel Ślączka and became his deputy.

As the area was further organized, the beginnings of underground districts were established in Białystok, Bielsk Podlaski, Zambrów, Łomża, Wysokie Mazowieckie, Augustów, and Sokółka. In mid-October, Lt. Col. Ślączka travelled to Warsaw, established contact with the Polish Armed Forces Headquarters, and reported on the activities already underway. He remained in Warsaw and was sent to the Kraków District.

At the end of 1939 Major Feliks Banasiński was sent to Białystok as acting district commander. Major Banasiński, along with Lieutenant Colonel Nikodem Sulik, appointed commander of the Vilnius district, arrived in Białystok. Major Banasiński assumed command of the district, leaving Marecki (Iglewski "Antoś" and "Nieczuj") as his deputy and district chief of staff. While Banasiński's role in the underground is unclear, it is known, that by early 1940, the actual command over the local underground was held by Lieutenant Iglewski. The delegate of the ZWZ Headquarters for the Białystok Voivodeship, Second Lieutenant Marian Szklarski "Stefan" held authority granted to him by General Stefan Rowecki regarding the regulation of command positions and soon recognized Iglewski as the commander of the district.

The newly formed headquarters was already well known to the Soviets, leading to the arrest of two of its members in October 1940. In November 1940, during an inspection of organizational units in the Tykocin area, the NKVD arrested Colonel Józef Spychalski and Lieutenant Antoni Iglewski and Captain Władysław Liniarski assumed command of the Białystok ZWZ District succeeding Spychalski. Seeing the increasing arrests among the underground members, the commander of the Białystok ZWZ-AK District decided to suspend the underground's activities. This state of affairs lasted until the outbreak of war between the Nazi Germany and the Soviet Union with activities focused mainly on organizational, propaganda and intelligence activities, and to a lesser extent on sabotage and diversionary activities.

After the outbreak of the German-Soviet war in June 1941, the Białystok District command intensified its efforts to prepare the area for a general uprising against the German forces. Grodno became important communication point with courier routes from Königsberg, Kaunas, Riga, Vilnius, Navahrudak, and Minsk running through the city. Based on instructions from the ZWZ-AK Headquarters, at the turn of April and May 1942, it developed training manuals and instructions for combat platoons, the Military Service for the Protection of the Uprising, security teams, communications patrols, and medics. In October 1942, these manuals were distributed to individual Districts. Home Army soldiers in these units were trained in weapons science, combat training, and urban warfare, mainly at Grodno area. At the end of 1942, training began for soldiers in specialist sapper, sabotage, motor, gunsmith, sanitary, gendarmerie, and vehicle teams.

In 1943 Bureau of Information and Propaganda in the Białystok region began publishing the "Głos Ziemi Białystokskiej" (Voice of the Białystok Region). In addition to this periodical, the BIP also distributed the clandestine "Biuletyn Ziemi Białystokskiej" (Biuletyn Ziemi Podlaskiej), a continuation of the "Biuletyn Ziemi Podlaskiej" (Biuletyn Ziemi Podlaskiej) published since August 1942.

The Białystok District Command of the ZWZ-AK, in accordance with instructions from the Main Headquarters, organized two intelligence branches. The first was located in Białystok and the second in Grodno. The intelligence units gathered much information and also infiltrated the network of Poles and Belarusians operating within the Belarusian Committee, which collaborated with the Germans. It had contacts at German occupation offices, warehouses, workshops, enterprises, military units and prisons, and so data on prisoner headcounts, executions, and deportations to concentration camps were obtained. intelligence unit also recorded rail and road transports to the Eastern Front. Monthly reports included the quantity and quality of individual transports, including their type, weapons, food, or people. Within the intelligence unit, legalization unit was formed to deal with creation of fake documents for the district members. In order no. 97 of February 20, 1943, the commander of the Białystok District, Liniarski in accordance with orders received from the Home Army General Command, established sabotage units in the area under his command.

By Order No. 256 of April 20, 1944, Liniarski, assigned the names of Polish Army regiments to partisan units and Kedyw units of the Białystok District of the Home Army. For example, Augustów District No. 7 "Olcha" of the Suwałki Inspectorate was to recreate the 1st Krechowiecki Uhlan Regiment. Its temporary name during the formation period was "Partisan Unit of the 1st Uhlan Regiment."

Liniarski, who opposed the planned Operation "Burza" emphasized in his orders to inspectorate and district commanders the will to defeat the Germans, prepare for self-defense, and, in the event of communist control of the area and hostility toward the Polish population, engage in further clandestine activities. Around July 10, 1944, Liniarski issued an order to begin Operation "Burza" in the area of the Łomża Inspectorate.

Following the occupation of the territories under the command's control in July 1944 and forces mobilization to the Polish Armed Forces in the East (mainly Berling's Army), a decree was issued to begin operation to promote desertion of conscripted soldiers.

== Organizational structure ==
The District command had a staff and subordinated to it were the District Delegation and the Civil Fight Command operated.

The Białystok District was divided to 6 inspectorates:

- Podlaski Inspectorate
- Masovian Inspectorate
- Łomża Inspectorate
- Suwałki Inspectorate
- Białystok Inspectorate
- Grodno Inspectorate

The Białystok District received the codename "Pełnia" at the General Headquarters, and later "Sarna." In 1943, the codename was changed to "Bekas".

== Commanders ==
- Lt. Col. Franciszek Slęczka "Krak"
- Maj. Feliks Banasiński
- Lt. Antoni Iglewski "Nieczuja"
- Lt. Col. Józef Spychalski "Samuraj" (Marian's brother)
- Capt/Lt. Col. Władysław Liniarski "Mścisław".
