= Osiedle Nowe Miasto, Białystok =

Nowe Miasto
- District (osiedle) of Białystok
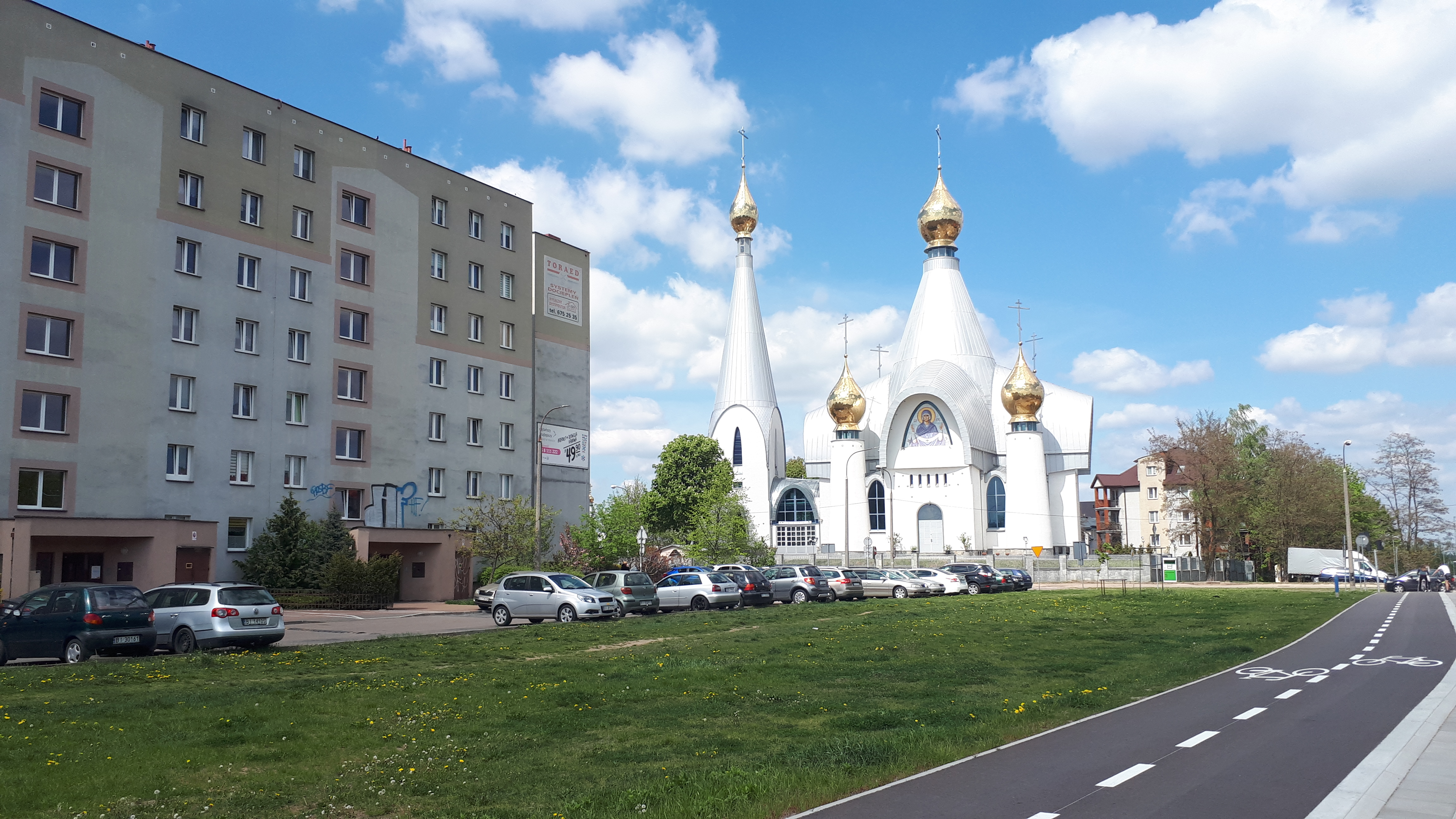
- View of Nowe Miasto, May 2020

- Location of Nowe Miasto within Białystok
- Coordinates: 53°06′41″N 23°07′09″E
- Country: Poland
- Voivodeship: Podlaskie
- City: Białystok

Area
  - Total: 3.785 km^{2} (1.461 sq mi)
- Time zone: UTC+1 (CET)
  - Summer (DST): UTC+2 (CEST)
- Area code: +48 85
- Vehicle registration: BI

Nowe Miasto is one of the districts of the Polish city of Białystok.

== History ==
The area of today's Nowe Miasto got its name in the 1980s but its territory was the location of old settlements such as the village Słoboda. It was founded at the end of the 17th century between today's Pogodna and Świerkowa streets, around. It had about 11–12 houses. At the end of the 18th century, the village was a linear village located on the right (eastern) bank of a now non-existent, nameless stream, a tributary of the Horodnianka River. The layout of its buildings at that time, with houses facing the street with their gables might hint that it was regulated during the Volok Reform. The village buildings were located in the area of today's Emilii Plater street and the parallel section of today's Sławińskiego street. Residents were probably exempt from taxes hence the name Sloboda (liberty).

In May 1919 the village was included in Greater Białystok and designated as "garden city" which was then divided into building plots in 1925, an official colony. It is part of the architectural assumption of this colony laid out according to the assumptions of the Garden City. The Central Square of the Garden City is located at the intersection of Pułaskiego Streets (then Żurawie), Wspólna and Strzelecka. After the Second World War, there were about 50 houses in Słoboda.

The Nowe Miasto district was founded at the beginning of the 20th century, hence the distinctive name. The area of the modern Nowe Miasto district was defined by the City National Council resolution in Białystok of November 31, 1959 on the establishment of the districts of the city of Białystok: composed of Nowe Miasto, Swoboda, Bażantarnia and the former village of Starosielce. The borders run Kopernika and Zwierzyniecka Road, Świerkowa, Wiosenna, Zambrowska Road, along the tracks by rail from Bielsko to Południowa Avenue. The former village of Horodniany bordered on the south from in the village of Starosielce. The southern border of the village of Starosielce with the property of Horodyniany ran along Rzymowskiego, Wschodnia streets along the border with Białystok estate, along Zachodnia street. The latter got its name as it was the western border of the Białystok. The border than was parallel to today's Składowa street up to Depowa street, then from this point along a curved line towards today's Marczukowska Street, from where the direction of the border changed again to today's Popiełuszki Street and the petrol station, and from there back towards Rzymowskiego Street. Currently, the Nowe Miasto district also includes Kawaleryjska, Świerkowa, Kopernik, Ciołkowskiego streets (formerly Szosa to Zielona). These are the areas belonging once to the village of Swoboda (Słoboda).
