= Districts of Białystok =

This is a sub-article to Białystok

The city of Białystok is divided into 29 administrative units known in Polish as osiedle (housing estate, or residential neighborhood; plural: osiedla). The first 27 of these were created by City Council bylaw no. XXXI/331/04 of October 25, 2004. The 28th, Dojlidy Górne, was created by City Council bylaw no. LXII/787/06 of October 23, 2006, out of three settlements which had been incorporated into the city: Dojlidy Górne, Kolonia Halickie, and Zagórki. A new district called Bagnówka was created at the beginning of 2021.

== Osiedla of the city of Białystok ==
| Map of Białystok | Osiedla | |
| | 1. Centrum | 2. Białostoczek |
| | 3. Sienkiewicza | 4. Bojary |
| | 5. Piaski | 6. Przydworcowe |
| | 7. Młodych | 8. Antoniuk |
| | 9. Jaroszówka | 10. Wygoda |
| | 11. Piasta I | 12. Piasta II |
| | 13. Skorupy | 14. Mickiewicza |
| | 15. Dojlidy | 16. Bema |
| | 17. Kawaleryjskie | 18. Nowe Miasto |
| | 19. Zielone Wzgórza | 20. Starosielce |
| | 21. Słoneczny Stok | 22. Leśna Dolina |
| | 23. Wysoki Stoczek | 24. Dziesięciny I |
| | 25. Dziesięciny II | 26. Bacieczki |
| | 27. Zawady | 28. Dojlidy Górne |
| | 29. Bagnówka | |
