= Economy of Białystok =

This is a sub-article to Białystok

In the 19th century Białystok was an important center for light industry and was the reason for the substantial growth of the city's population. The tradition continued with many garment factories established in the 20th century, such as Fasty in the district of Bacieczki. However, after the fall of communism in 1989 many of these factories faced severe problems and subsequently closed down.

The unemployment rate for February 2011 in Białystok was 13.2%. The 2009 average household had a monthly per capita income of 1018.77 zł. and monthly per capita expenses of 823.56 zł.

== History ==
At that time, there were 219 industrial plants in the city employing 6,970 workers. Most of them (129) were textile companies. Before World War I, the factories were producing at full steam. The retreating Russians dismantled and took away machines and materials, and destroyed what they did not have time or could not take away. What is worse, Białystok entrepreneurs lost all their capital deposited in Russian banks. In addition, they were cut off from raw material resources and - very importantly - access to the absorbent Russian sales market. After these events, Białystok industry never returned to its former glory.

The interwar period was a very difficult time for the Białystok industry. Short periods of stabilization alternated with crises. At the beginning of the Second Polish Republic, thanks to state orders for uniforms for the new army, it was possible to partially rebuild the textile industry. However, Białystok factories were at a low technical level: manufacturers assembled machines on their own, often making missing parts. Therefore, the factories produced poor quality products: the cheapest cloth and blankets from the worst raw materials. In 1921, the Association of Białystok Large Industry was established. The favorable economic situation ended in 1924 after Stanisław Grabski's currency reform and in 1925, 90% of Białystok textile workers were unemployed. The Białystok industry had finally recovered from the effects of the crisis of the mid-1920s, and the great crisis of 1928-1933 came. It caused another wave of bankruptcies. This fate befell, among others, the well-known plywood factory belonging to Artur Hasbach. In 1938, there were 212 industrial plants in the city, of which 101 represented the textile industry. In the interwar years, even in the period of the greatest production, the Białystok textile industry did not exceed 70% of the state from 1914. New factories, despite the passage of time, did not match the old ones and lost the competition with Łódź. Although Białystok was an industrial city and the largest centre in north-eastern Poland, its occupational structure resembled that of neglected borderland towns and it had a large share of small craftsmen and shopkeepers.

== Industry ==
The leading industries in the city's economy are: food processing (production of meat products, fruit and vegetable products, the production of spirits, the production of frozen food, grain processing), electrical engineering (production tools and equipment for machine tools, production of electric heaters, manufacture and production mixers household appliances). There is also a developed machine industry (electronics, machinery and metal), plastic processing (production of household appliances), textiles (textiles and upholstery, manufacture of underwear, clothing accessories, footwear and backpacks), Wood (production plywood and furniture) building materials.

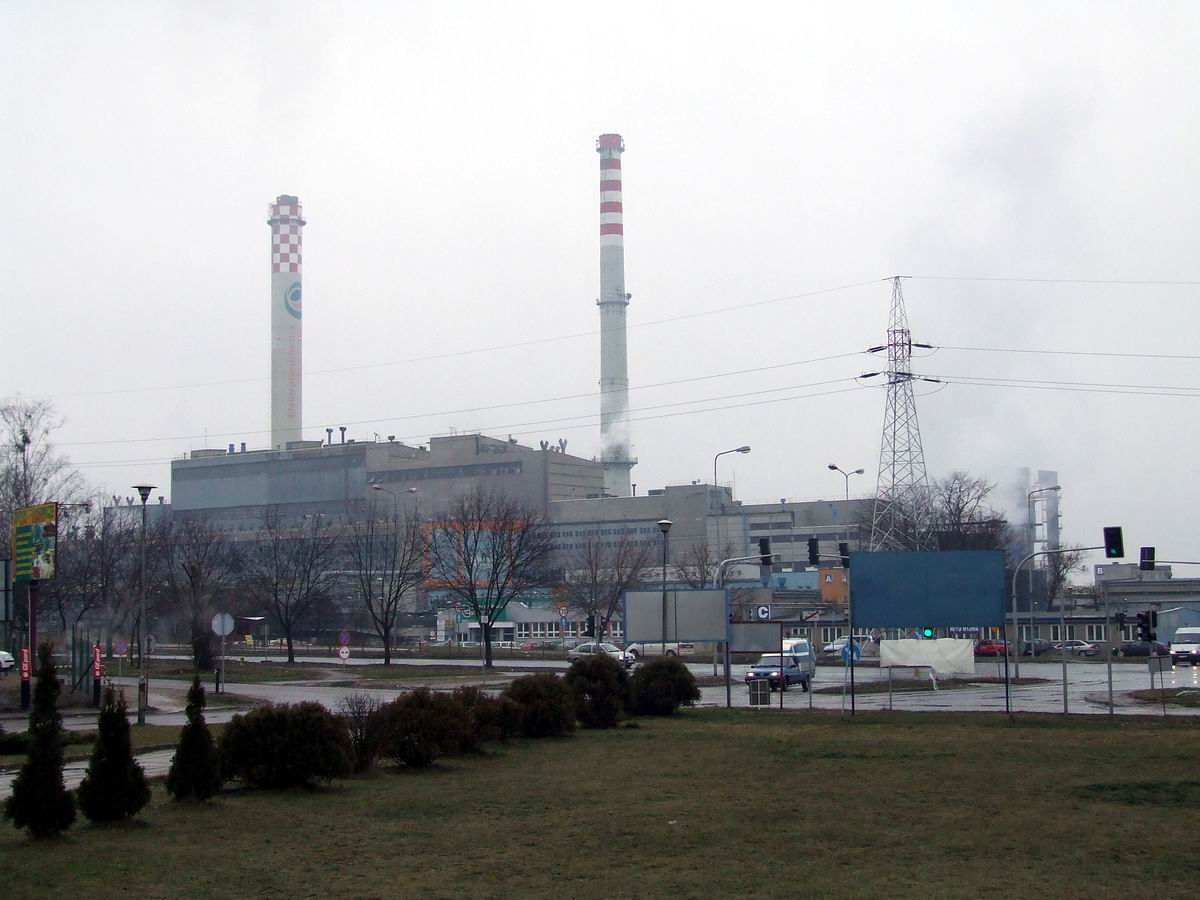
Białystok Power Station

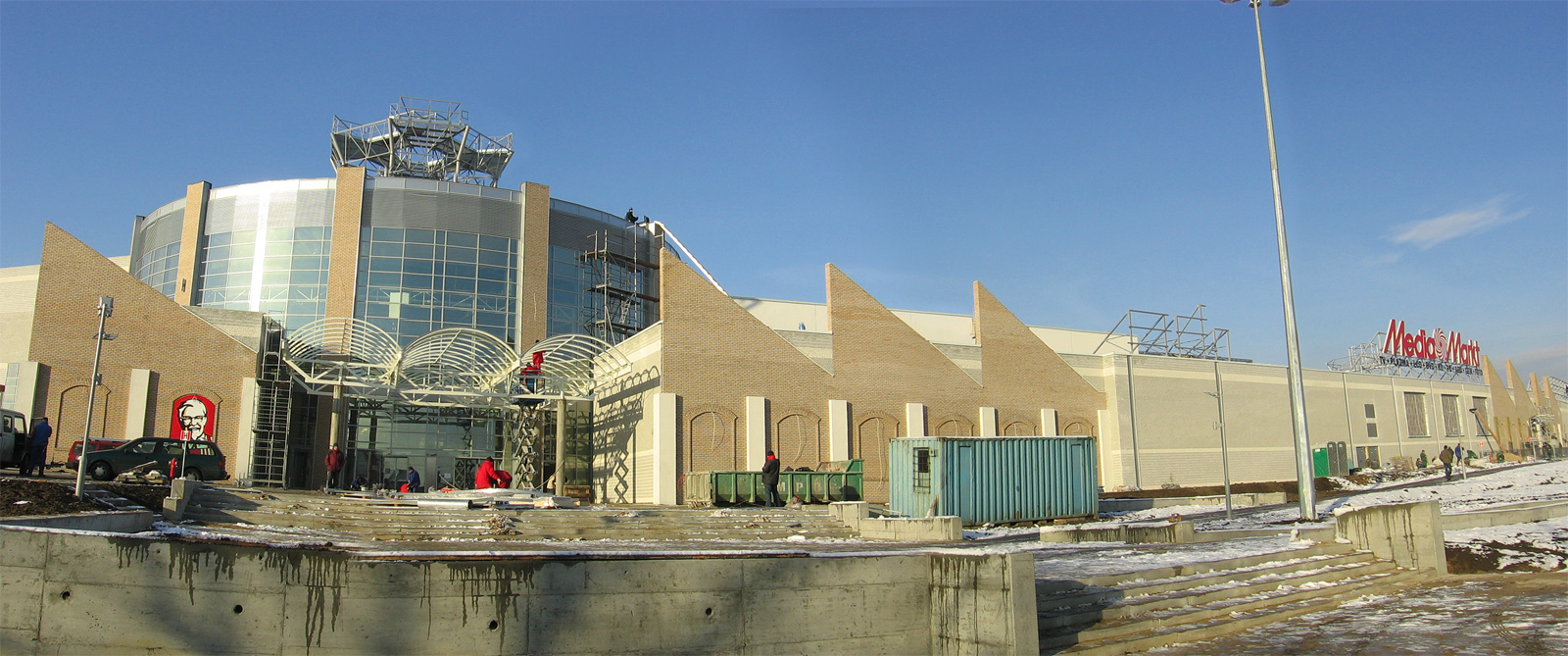
The White Gallery under construction (Galeria Biała)

Białystok is a major center for the textile industry is also developed machine industry (electronics, machinery and metal), wood, alcoholic beverages, building materials, glass factory and power generation.

- Agnella, a major Polish producer of carpets and similar products is in Białystok, located in the district of Białostoczek.
- Biaglass Huta Szkla Białystok was established in 1929 and has specialized in the production of mouth blown glass lampshades. Biaglass belongs to elite group of Glass Works in Europe, where 100% our lighting glass is mouth-blown.
- Białystok Power Station is a co-generation power plant in the city.
- Bianor, a Dutch-owned maker of plastic parts and products for the household appliances and other industries, is expanding its manufacturing facility in Białystok.
- Biazet is a large manufacture of household appliances, including vacuum cleaners, coffee makers, and LED lighting located in Białystok.
- Dojlidy Brewery in the district of Dojlidy and is owned by the Kompampania Piwowarska group. The brewery produces the second most popular beer in Poland, Żubr, featuring the motif of the European bison (one of Podlaskie's tourist attractions) in its marketing campaign.
- Philips Domestic Appliances has a factory in the city.
- PhotoAid, a biometric photography company, one of the organizations based in the Bialystok Science and Technology Park,
- Polmos Białystok, the biggest vodka manufacturer in Poland, is located in the city district of Starosielce. The company produces Absolwent and Żubrówka (bison grass vodka) - both major exports abroad.
- Rosti, a provider of precision injection molded products for some of the world's leading brands.
- SavaPol is a manufacturer of stationary and mobile concrete mixing equipment based in Białystok.
- Standard Motor Products began manufacturing ignition coils for original equipment manufacturers over thirty years ago.
- Supon Białystok is a production and trade enterprise with over 40 years of tradition. They are the leading Polish producer of fire fighting equipment.

=== Border crossings ===
The area has a number of nearby border crossings. The border with Belarus is only 50 km (31 mi) away, the nearest border crossings are located in; Bobrowniki (road crossing located about 50 km (31 mi) from the city limits), Kuźnica Białostocka (road and rail crossing located 60 km (37 mi) from the city limits), Siemianowka (railway - freight traffic), Połowce (road) and Czeremcha (railway).

Since the border with Belarus is also the eastern border of the European Union, as well as the Schengen Area the city is a center for trade in mainly from the east.

=== City budget ===
For the 2010-2011 Fiscal year the city received revenue (taxes levied + investments) of 1,409,565,525 zł, expended 1,676,459,102 zł leaving a budget deficit of 266,893,577 zł. The deficit was covered by short-term borrowing of 166,893,577 zł and the issuance of 100 million zł in municipal bonds.

=== Land use ===
The city covers 10,212 ha (25,230 acres) of which 3,210 ha (7,900 acres) is Agricultural land, 4,889 ha (12,080 acres) is Urbanized areas, 85 ha (210 acres) is surface waters and 65 ha (160 acres) is wasteland.

== International trade ==
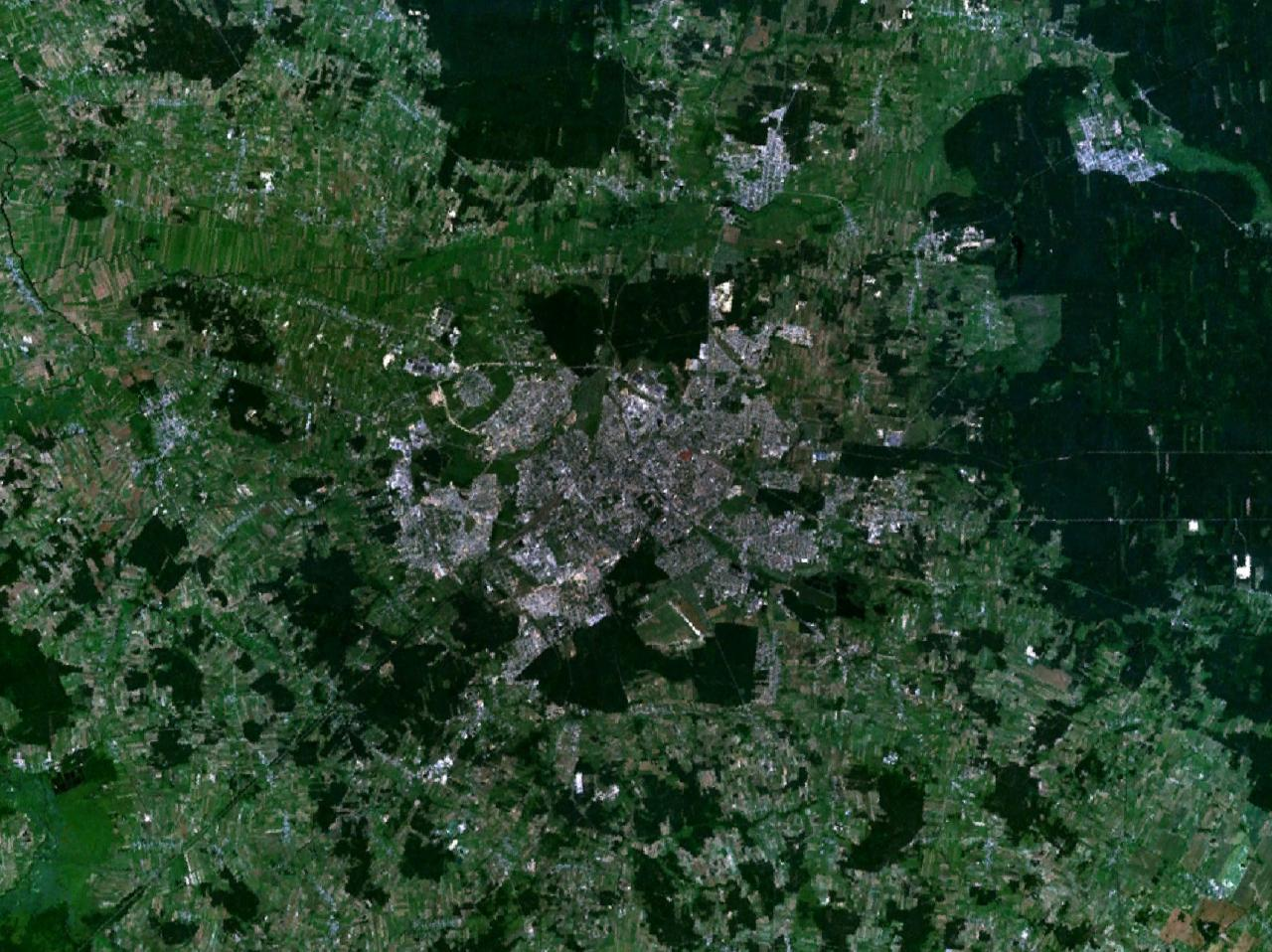
Białystok seen from SPOT satellite

The city lies close to the Polish border with Lithuania and Belarus, with the nearest border checkpoint with Belarus in Bobrowniki only 40 km (25 mi) away. Since the border with Belarus is also the eastern border of the European Union, as well as the Schengen Area, Białystok plays an important role in managing the border's security with the regional office of the Polish Border Guard, (Polish: Straż Graniczna) located in the city.

The city is a center for trade in mainly from the east. It works in the Eastern Market Promotion Centre. Białystok Market hosts international textiles and clothing, food processing, consumer goods, agricultural products, and food.

== Retail ==
In Białystok there are: 7 hypermarkets, 27 supermarkets, 9 shopping malls (Galeria Biała, Alfa, two Auchan, Kwadrat, Podlaska, Zielone Wzgórza, Galeria M, Galeria Antoniukowska), 19 electronic stores, supermarkets construction and decoration.
