= Osiedle Wygoda, Białystok =

Wygoda
- District (osiedle) of Białystok
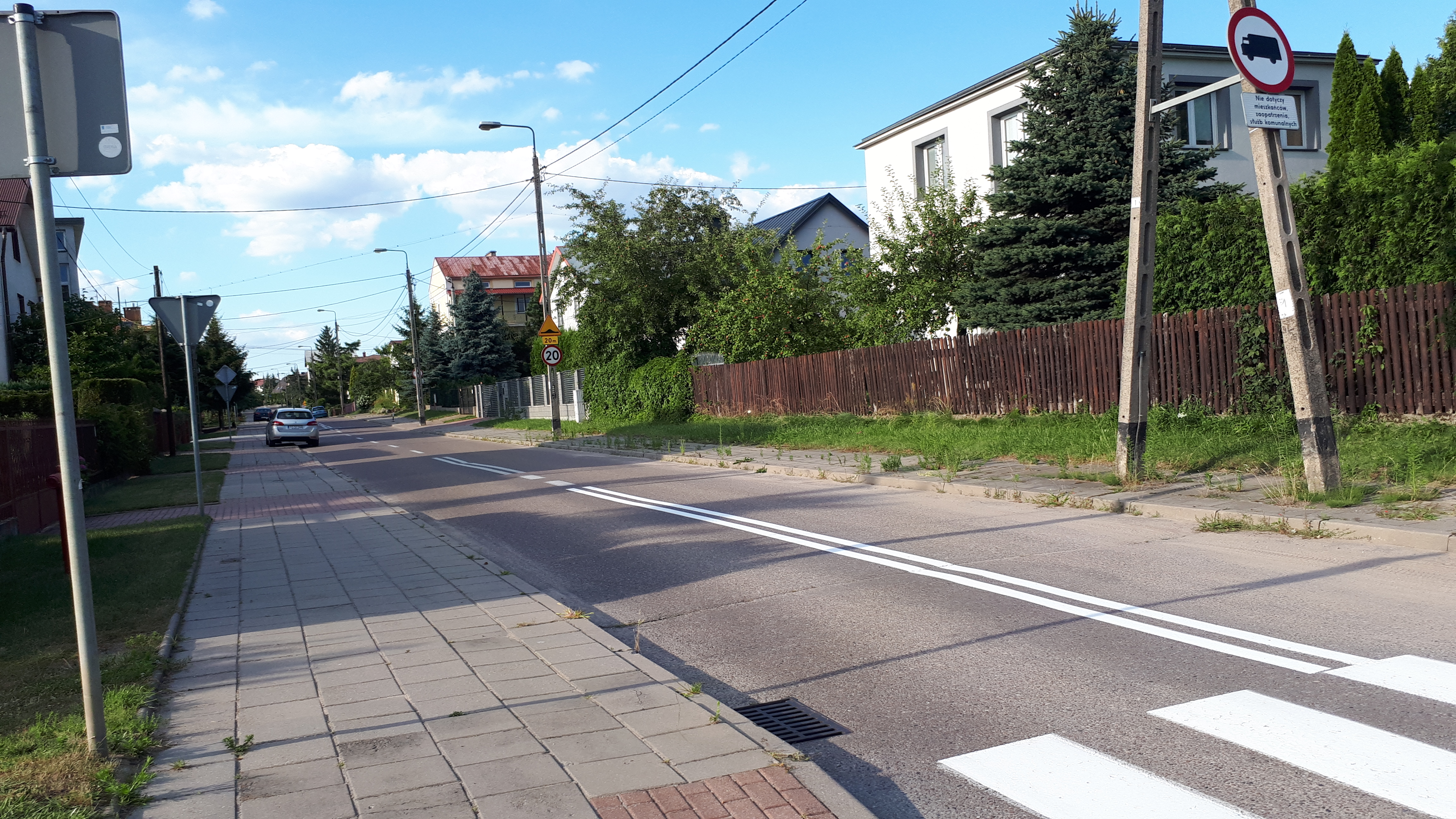
- View of Wygoda, 2020

- Location of Wygoda within Białystok
- Coordinates: 53°08′44″N 23°12′42″E
- Country: Poland
- Voivodeship: Podlaskie
- City: Białystok

Area
  - Total: 7.372 km^{2} (2.846 sq mi)
- Time zone: UTC+1 (CET)
  - Summer (DST): UTC+2 (CEST)
- Area code: +48 85
- Vehicle registration: BI

Wygoda is one of the districts of the Polish city of Białystok, located north and north-east of the historic city center.

== History ==
In the nineteenth century, the areas which today make up the district's territory belonged to the Kryński family and were the location of the villages Bagnówka, Pieczurki and Pietrasze. Its name comes from the forest inn "Wygoda" which was located on the road to Supraśl, around which the settlement developed. After the January Uprising, the tsarist authorities deported the family to Siberia, and their property was confiscated. A Voltaire received them, who later sold the land to two people, Koch and Sosnowski who in turn allocated a plot for the construction of tsarist military barracks, and the 64th Kazan infantry regiment (Russian: Казанский 64-й пехотный полк) moved to there. With the liberation of Białystok in 1919 and the establishment of the Second Polish Republic, the Polish Army occupied the barracks. They were rebuilt and named after Romuald Traugutt. From June 1921, the 42nd Infantry Regiment of the Polish Army was stationed there. A training ground was located in the Pietrasze Forest in nearby Jaroszówka district.

In the years 1934–1936, a military railway siding, five large, multi-storey warehouses, as well as administrative and auxiliary buildings were built here. The depot was to be useful in the event of war and the related mobilization of the Polish Army of the Second Polish Republic. This is how the complex of intent was created as a base for the 18th Infantry Division, whose staff was stationed in Łomża. From August 1944, the warehouses at Węglowa Street were used as supply base for the Soviet Armed Forces. After the reorganization of the army following the establishment of the People's Republic of Poland, from 1952 the warehouses were again used as a base for the land base of material troops. Initially, the 18th Central Food Depot (Polish: Centralna Składnica Żywnościowa, (JW 3215)) was stationed there, and from 1977 by the 1st Quartermaster Squad (Polish: Rejonowa Składnica Kwatermistrzowska) (JW 1590).

=== World War II ===
In September 1939 with the onset of the Second World War and Invasion of Poland, the soldiers of the regiment left the barracks and fought against Nazi Germany at Ostrołęka, Myszyniec, and Nowogród. Following the Soviet occupation of the city and the Red Army was stationed in the barracks. In 1941 the Germans entered again the city and used the barracks. In 1944, when retreating from Bialystok, the Wehrmacht destroyed the city and set fire to the barracks. The barracks were finally demolished in 1951 with some building materials were used in the construction of a textile factory in Fasty district.

=== Church of the Holy Heart of Jesus ===
At first it was an orthodox church for the Kazan infantry regiment at the military barracks. From 1927, after the reconstruction, the church was converted to a catholic one, it was a garrison church and called Church of the Sacred Heart of Jesus (Polish: Kościół Najświętszego Serca Pana Jezusa w Białymstoku).

During World War II, the church was badly damaged. After entering the Białystok, the Soviets completely devastated the interior and tractors were used to demolish the tower. In 1946, thanks to the commitment of priest Aleksander Syczewski and its residents, it was renovated. Finally, the reconstruction was completed by the priest Bogusław Kieżel.

=== After the war ===
The post war period saw massive growth and construction as with the rest of Bialystok when the old wooden buildings gave way to new buildings, a residential block housing was established at Wasilkowska Street and new industrial areas were also created (Preventative Police base in 42 Pułku Piechoty Street 44), Municipal Cleaning Company (Polish: Miejskie Przedsiębiorstwo Oczyszczania) in 42 Pułku Piechoty Street 48, Youth Correctional Facility (42 Pułku Piechoty Street 117 ), National Horticultural Farm Huta Szkła. In the 1960s a municipal gasworks (Dolistowska 1 Street) was built in the district. Also located in the district are a Roman Catholic Cemetery and Jewish Cemetery. Even though modern industrial construction occurred, few surviving old houses exists such as the one at 16 Kapralska Street.

According to a resolution of the city council adopted on October 25, 2004, on the new administrative division of Białystok, the Bagnówka and Pieczurki were incorporated to the enlarged Wygoda district.

In second decade of the 21st century transport arteries in the district were renovated and modernized: Two modern two-level road junctions were built: intersection of Wasilkowska Street with Andersa Street and the intersection of Casimir the Great street with a route to Bobrowniki (road 65). A modern route was created, running from the General Andersa railway viaduct to Wasilkowska Street and further along the new St. General Sulik to Zaścianiki.
