= Osiedle Starosielce, Białystok =

Starosielce
- District (osiedle) of Białystok
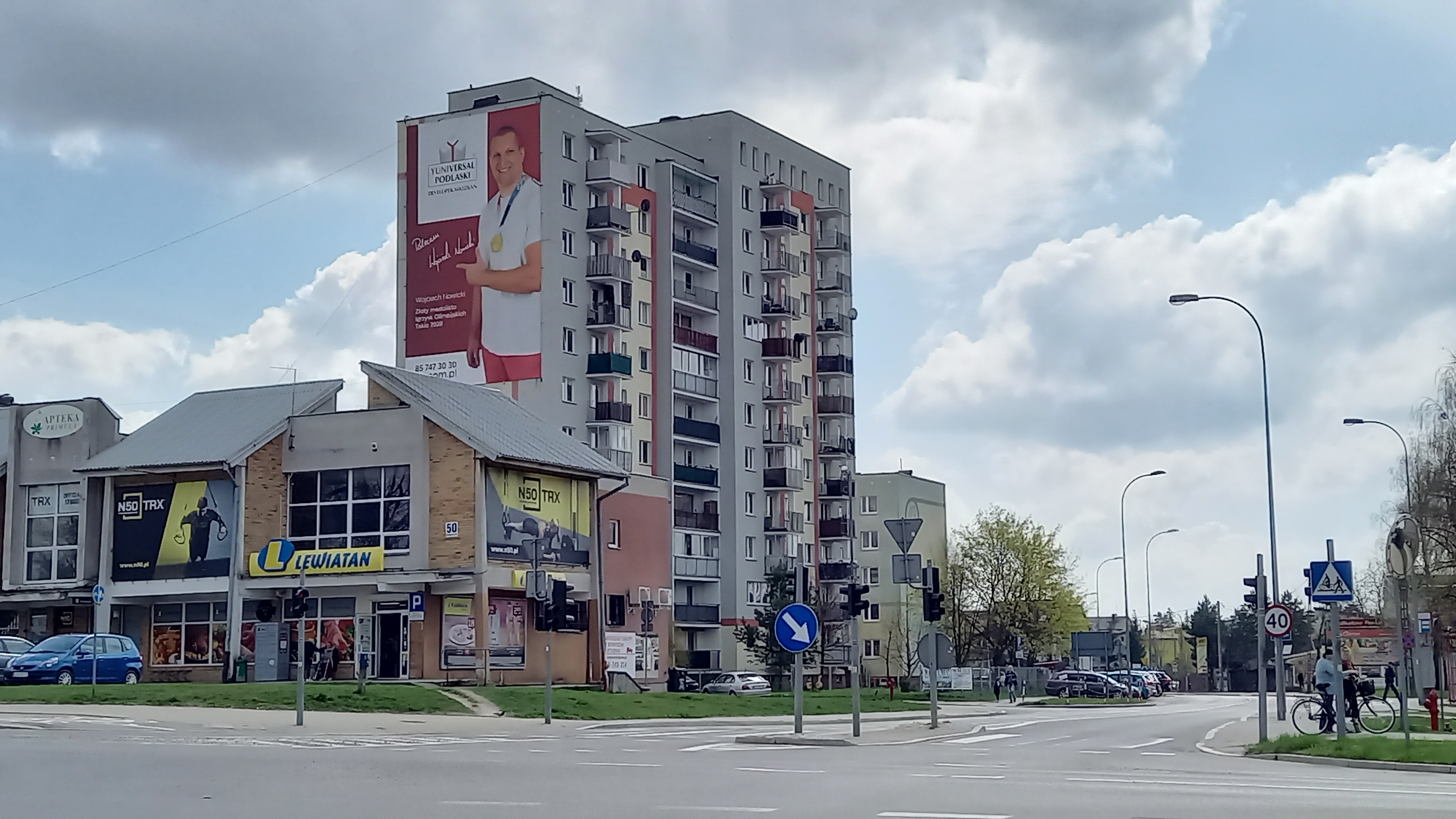

- Location of Zielone Wzgórza within Białystok
- Coordinates: 53°07′26″N 23°04′57″E
- Country: Poland
- Voivodeship: Podlaskie
- City: Białystok

Area
  - Total: 4.945 km^{2} (1.909 sq mi)
- Time zone: UTC+1 (CET)
  - Summer (DST): UTC+2 (CEST)
- Area code: +48 85
- Vehicle registration: BI

Starosielce (lit. Old Settlement) is a district of Białystok, Poland, located in the western part of the city.

== History ==
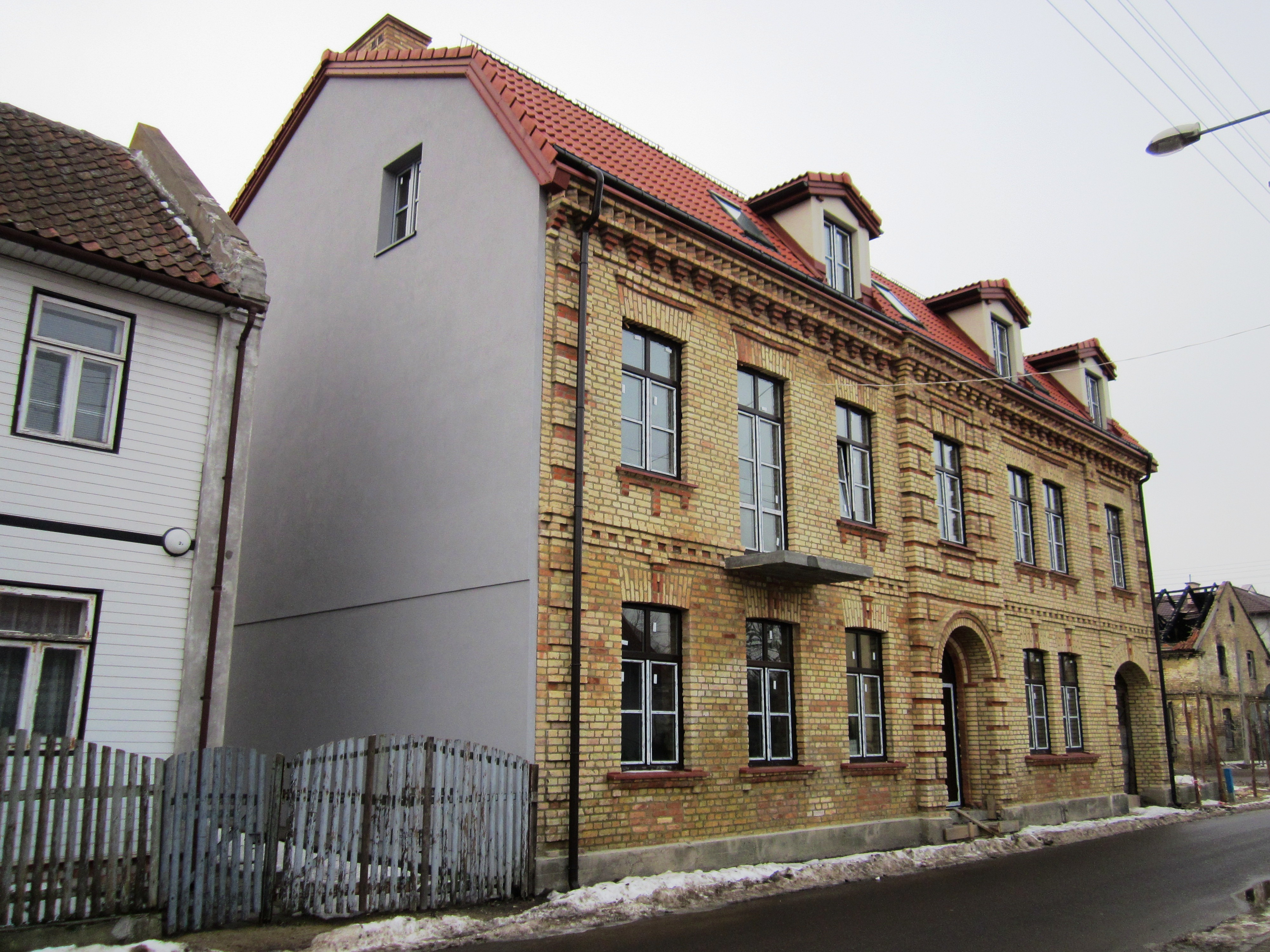
Old townhouses

The district traces its name to the village of Starosielce that existed before 1547. The first written source in which it was mentioned was a document delimiting the Białystok church property from 29 March 1533. The name of the village may indicate its older metrics. In the second half of the 18th century, Starosielce was part of the Wysokie Stok grange belonging to Jan Klemens Branicki. At that time, there were eighteen farms there. At the end of the 18th century, the village was a linear village located on the left (western) bank of the Biała River. The layout of its buildings at that time – with houses facing the street with their gables – suggests that it was founded or regulated during the Volok Reform.

Towards the later 19th century, the development of Starosielce was closely related to the Iron Railway Repair Center established in 1873. The settlement developed quickly with people pulled to the area. The railway authorities willingly employed both newcomers from Russia who worked on the railway or in the metal industry, as well as professionals associated with the construction of the Saint Petersburg–Warsaw Railway just before the January Uprising. Many builders also settled in Białystok and the nearby villages of Klepacze and Oliszki. Owners also came from Polish landed estates that were under the Tsarist partition. In the 1890s, Starosielce was a large village in the Białystok commune. The area of its agricultural land was 3,000 square Morgen. A third of the village's inhabitants were Germans.

After the First World War and the victory of the newly established Poland over Soviet Russia, many legionnaire soldiers settled in Starosielce. Legionnaire Mieczysław Bieguński lived in the district and member of the city council. He was active in the social committee for the construction of the Monument of Independence, which was set up on the square next to the Białystok Starosielce railway station, and in the foundation, which through residents' contributions issued a commemorative plaque on the anniversary of the death of Józef Piłsudski. Between 1919 and 1954 Starosielce had town rights. According to the 1921 census, the population of Starosielce was 97.2% Polish, 1.7% Belarusian and 0.7% Jewish.

After the Second World War and the establishment of the People's Republic of Poland everything related to Piłsudski, his life and activities was banned. and so, the board has been hidden. In the 1970s, during the demolition of the house where Bieguński's shop was, the workers found a cracked plaque in the basement of the house. On 1 April 1954, it was incorporated to Białystok. when it was annexed to Białystok. Later on an industrial district was developed around Elewatorska street with various enterprises including Polmos Białystok and Podlaskie Zakłady Zbożowe. In 2026 it was announced that a residential complex featuring retail and service spaces will be developed on the site of the former hall and transit warehouse.
