= Osiedle Słoneczny Stok, Białystok =

Słoneczny Stok
- District (osiedle) of Białystok
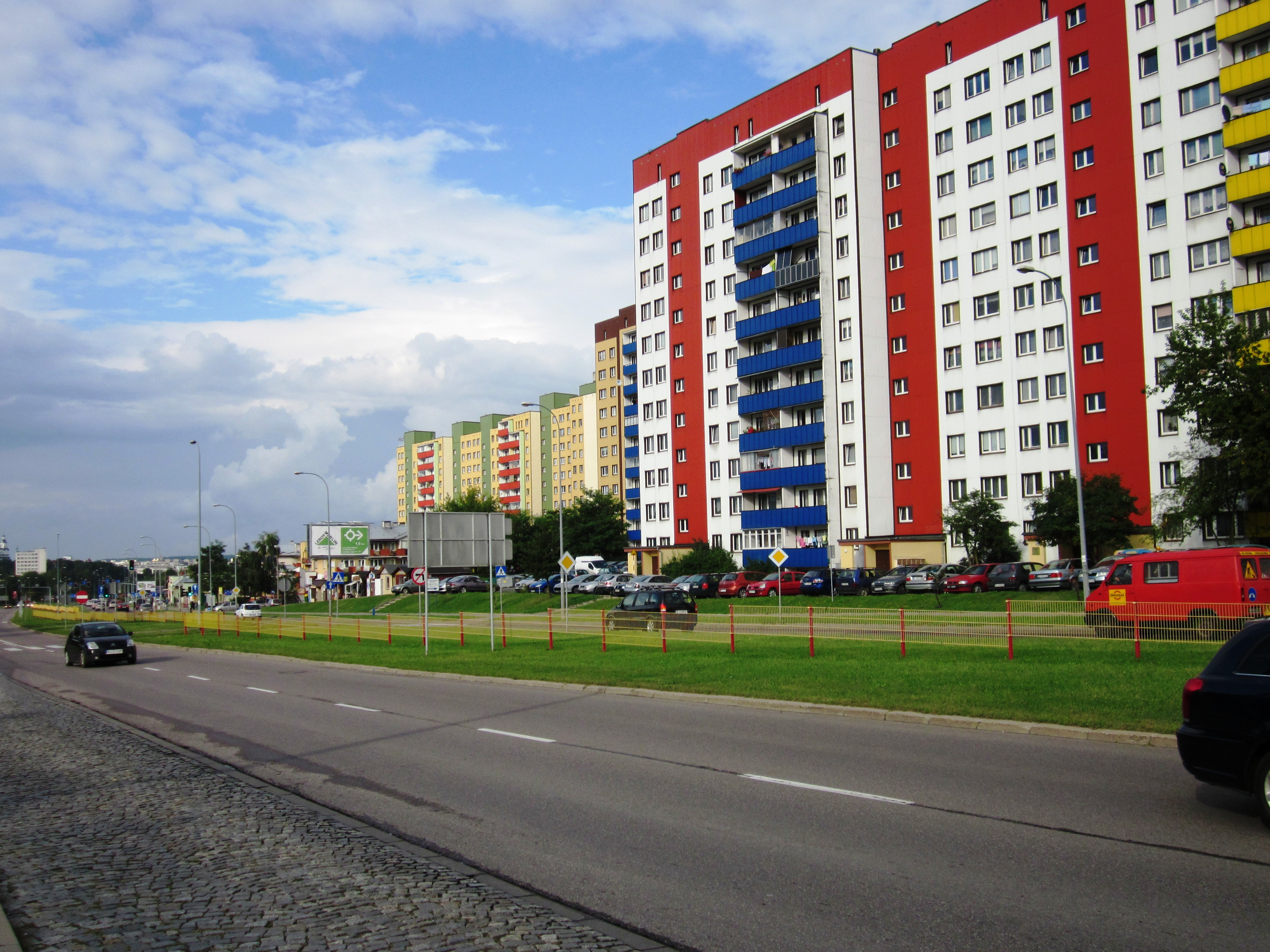
- Apartment blocks at Sikorskiego street

- Location of Słoneczny Stok within Białystok
- Coordinates: 53°07′45″N 23°06′25″E
- Country: Poland
- Voivodeship: Podlaskie
- City: Białystok

Area
  - Total: 1.061 km^{2} (0.410 sq mi)
- Time zone: UTC+1 (CET)
  - Summer (DST): UTC+2 (CEST)
- Area code: +48 85
- Vehicle registration: BI

Słoneczny Stok is a district in the Polish city of Białystok, located in the western part of the city. The name means literally 'Sunny Slope' and is a pun on the name Białystok, which stands for 'White slope'.

== History ==
In the territory of the district a windmill existed in the area of today's intersection of Hetmańska and Marczukowska streets. A pond exists there up today, was a popular place for rest before the war, along with Dojlidy Ponds.

The plan was that hat the buildings would rise along with the terrain. From the side of Hetmańska Street, low atrial and terraced houses are planned, then three-story blocks transforming into 5- and 8-story buildings. The 11-story skyscrapers were to be the culmination. Only the concept of the northern part of the estate (the area of Wincentego Witosa and Skrajna streets) changed, where - instead of houses - blocks were also built.

The district was designed in the OWT-75 technology. Elements of the system were made by the Białystok Fadom-II It was planned to populate the blocks in December 1979. Finally, it only began after the new year, on January 21, 1980. Then the keys to the apartments were collected by tenants from the block at 68 Upalna Street. Eugeniusz Truszkowski from PZPR Bialystok Voivodeship Committee and vice-president Witalis Sadowski, as well as presidents of housing cooperatives and representatives of the contractor from Kombinat Budownictwa Mieszkaniowego. The competition jury consisting of Mieczysław Chaja (deputy chief of "Gazeta Współczesna"), Krystyna Jaroszewicz (member of the estate design team from "Inwestprojekt"), Zygmunt Kramarczuk (city architect) and Zenon Masalski (deputy president of the Provincial Housing Cooperative) selected seven names, among which The readers would ultimately choose the one and the best. The seven included: "Na Stoku", "Słoneczny Stok", "Słoneczne", "Zielone Wzgórza", "Na Wyżyny". "Wyżyny" and "Nad Bażantarka". Ultimately, the most votes - although it was not stated how many - were given to the name "Słoneczny Stok".
