= Osiedle Zawady, Białystok =

Zawady
- District (osiedle) of Białystok
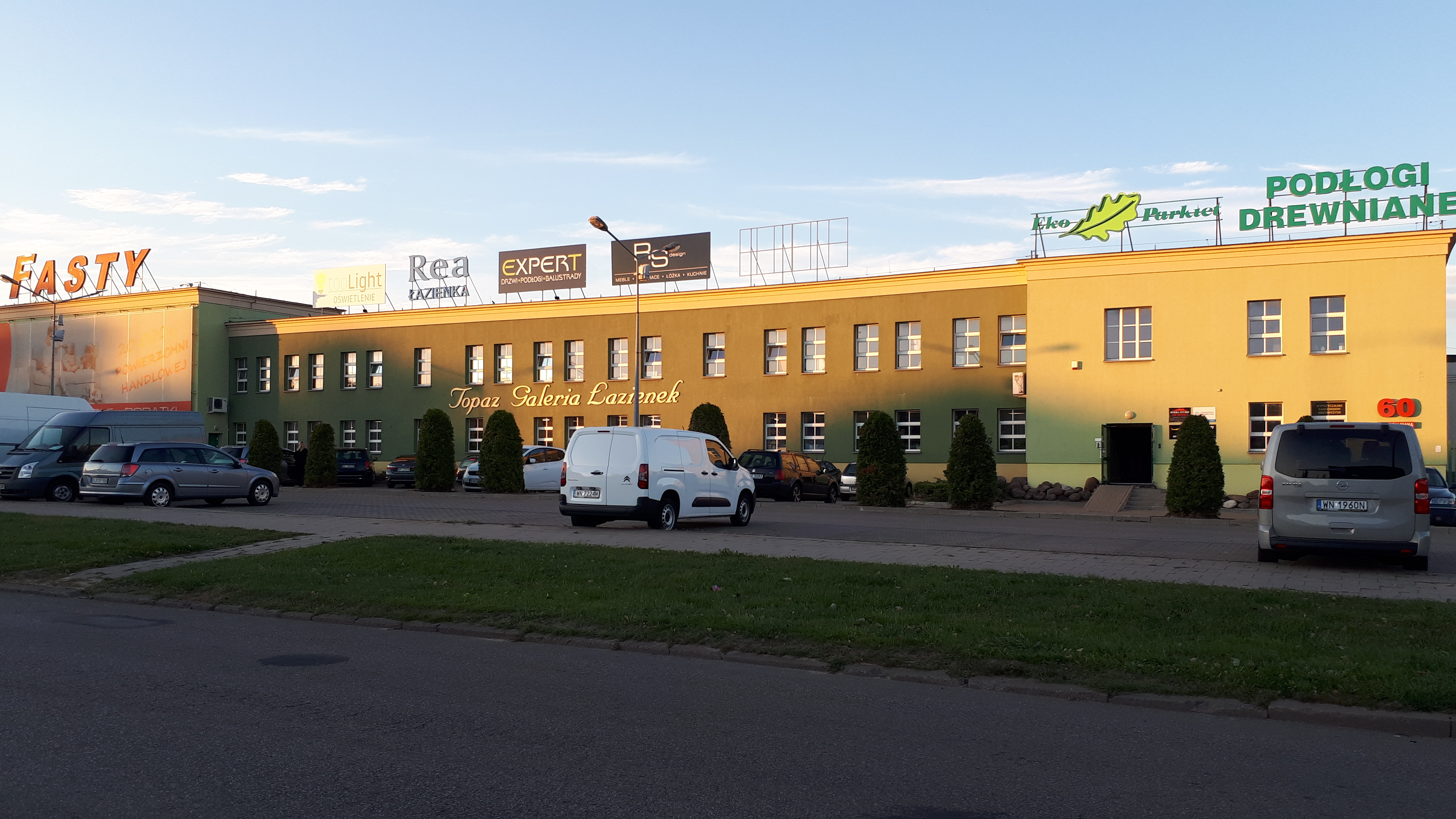
- View of Fasty Shopping Center, September 2020

- Location of Zawady within Białystok
- Coordinates: 53°09′57″N 23°06′40″E
- Country: Poland
- Voivodeship: Podlaskie
- City: Białystok
- Incorporated: 2002

Area
  - Total: 10.7 km^{2} (4.1 sq mi)
- Time zone: UTC+1 (CET)
  - Summer (DST): UTC+2 (CEST)
- Area code: +48 85
- Vehicle registration: BI

Zawady is a district (osiedle) of Białystok, Poland. It is located in the north-eastern part of the city close to National road 19 and Expressway S8.

== History ==
The district's name takes its origin from the village located there, established in the second half of the 18th century, with 25 farms and belonged to Jan Klemens Branicki. There was also an inn with a brewery in the village. At the end of this century, Zawady was a linear village located on the right (eastern) bank of the Biała River. The layout of its buildings at that time with houses facing the street with their gables suggests that it was founded or regulated during the Volok Reform. At the turn of the 20th century, Zawady was a peasant village in the commune of Białostoczek. The area of the village land covered 480 dessiatin (approx. 524.4 ha), including 175 dessiatin of meadows and pastures (approx. 191.2 ha), 5 dessiatins of forest (approx. 5.5 ha) and 34 dessiatin of wasteland (approx. 37.1 ha). The areas of Zawady were incorporated into Białystok on May 10, 1919 but the village itself incorporated into the city in 2002. According to the 1921 census, the population of Zawady was 98.5% Polish and 1.5% Belarusian. The village's spatial layout was preserved in the contemporary district, with Zawady street as the main road which crossed the village while Liliowa and Dolna Streets are old roads that bounded the village's yards from the east and west. In 2023 Liliowa, Orląt Lwowskich and Zamojskiego streets were paved and renovated.
