= Osiedle Dojlidy Górne, Białystok =

Dojlidy Górne
- District (osiedle) of Białystok
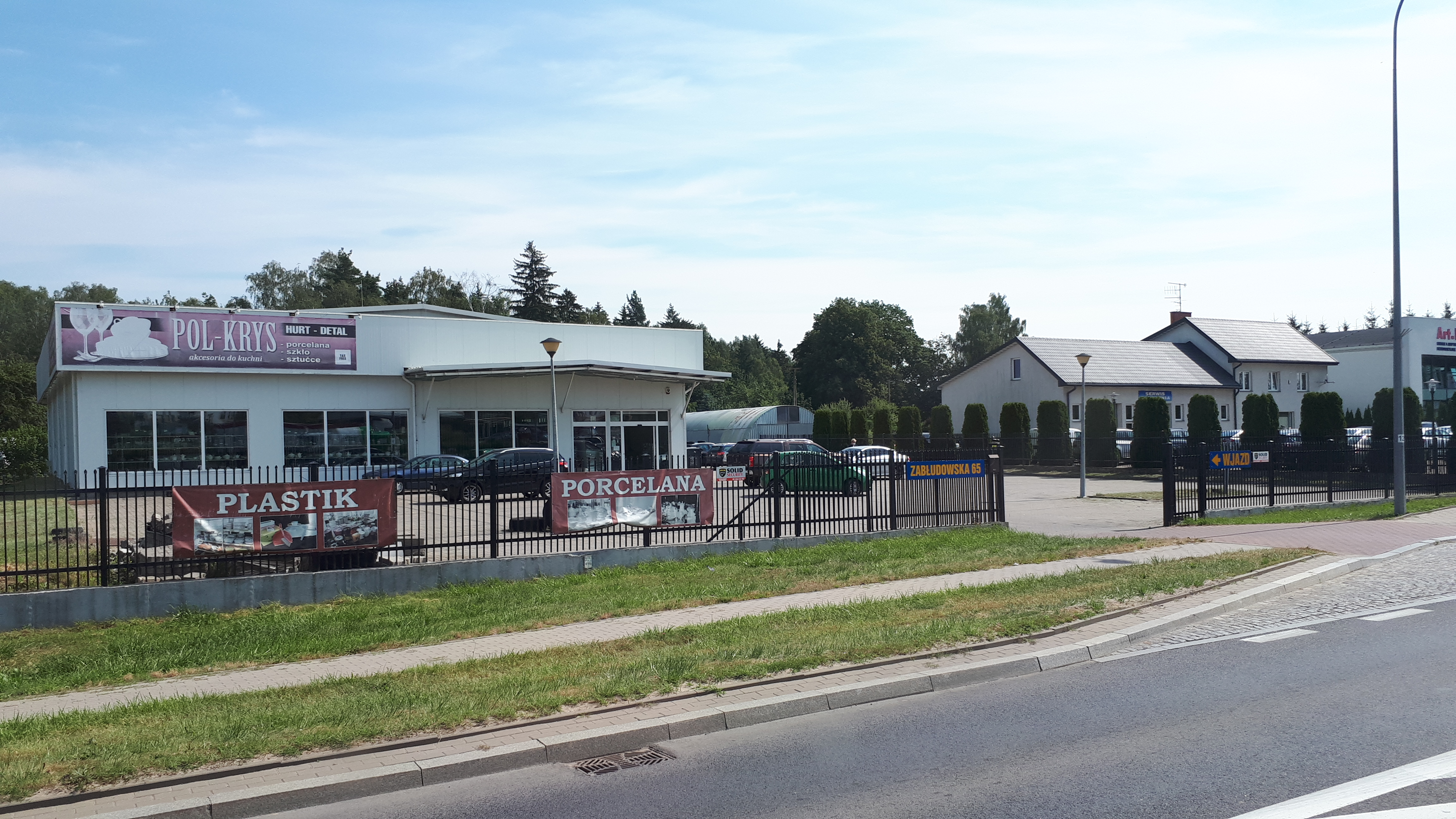
- View of Zabłudowska Street in Dojlidy Górne, July 2020

- Location of Dojlidy Górne within Białystok
- Coordinates: 53°05′28″N 23°13′20″E
- Country: Poland
- Voivodeship: Podlaskie
- City: Białystok
- Incorporated: 2006

Area
  - Total: 8.33 km^{2} (3.22 sq mi)
- Time zone: UTC+1 (CET)
  - Summer (DST): UTC+2 (CEST)
- Area code: +48 85
- Vehicle registration: BI

Dojlidy Gorne is one of the districts of the Polish city of Białystok. It was incorporated into the city limits in 2006. Formerly, it was a village of the same name. The etymology of the name comes from Lithuanian word – dailidė (carpenter).
