= 42nd Infantry Regiment (Poland) =

42th Infantry Regiment
- 42 pułk piechoty
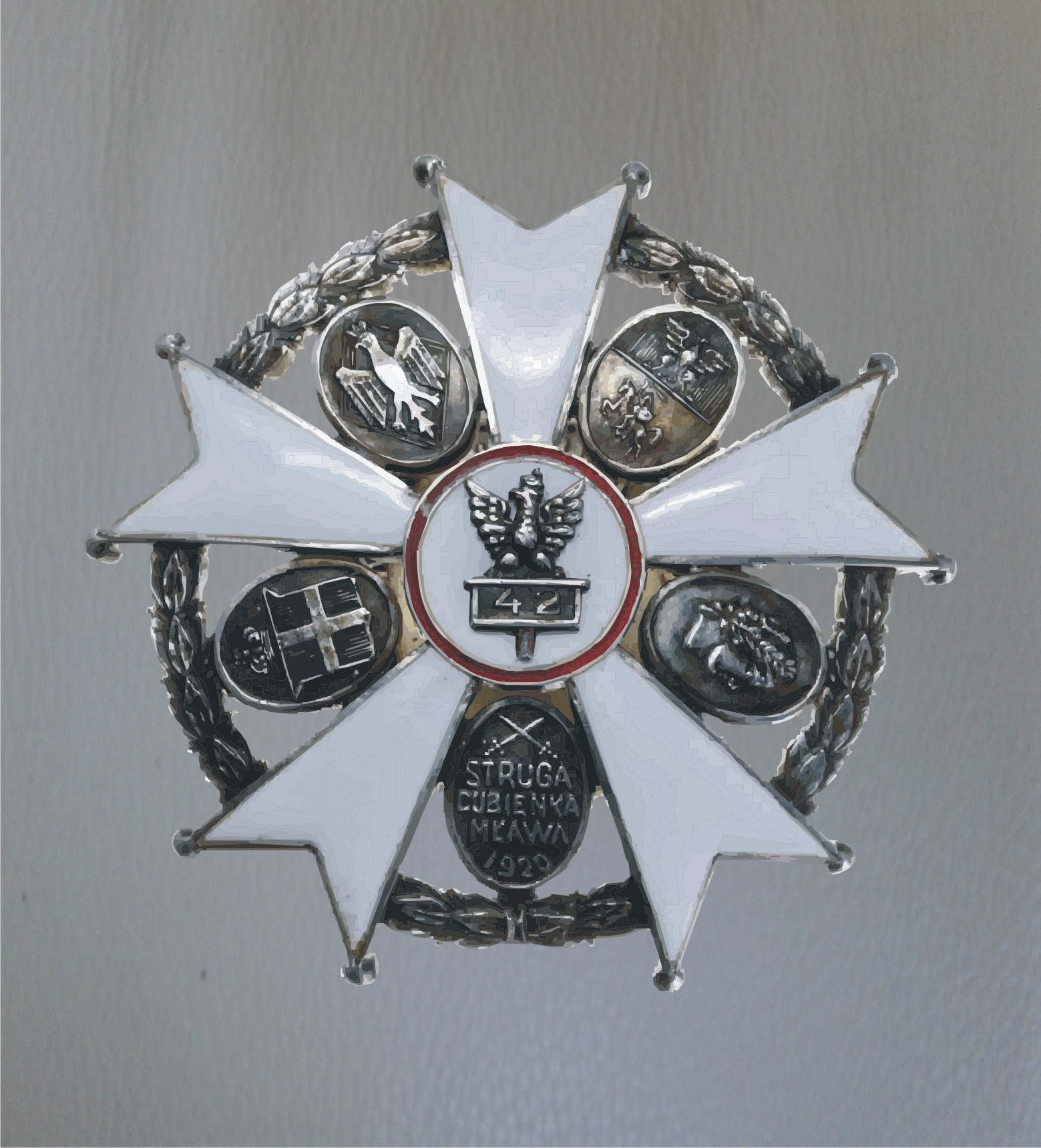
- 4th Reconnaissance Battalion insignia
- Active: 1918-1939
- Allegiance: Second Polish Republic
- Branch: Polish Armed Forces
- Type: Infantry
- Part of: 18th Infantry Division
- Garrison/HQ: Białystok
- Patron: Jan Henryk Dąbrowski
- Anniversaries: 23 of May, 12 of July
- Engagements: World War I: Battle of the Wkra; Battle of Wołoczyska; World War II

42th Infantry Regiment (Polish: 42 Pułk Piechoty im. Generała Jana Henryka Dąbrowskiego) was an infantry regiment of the Polish Armed Forces of the Second Polish Republic. They stationed at the barracks Traugutta street in Białystok.

== History ==
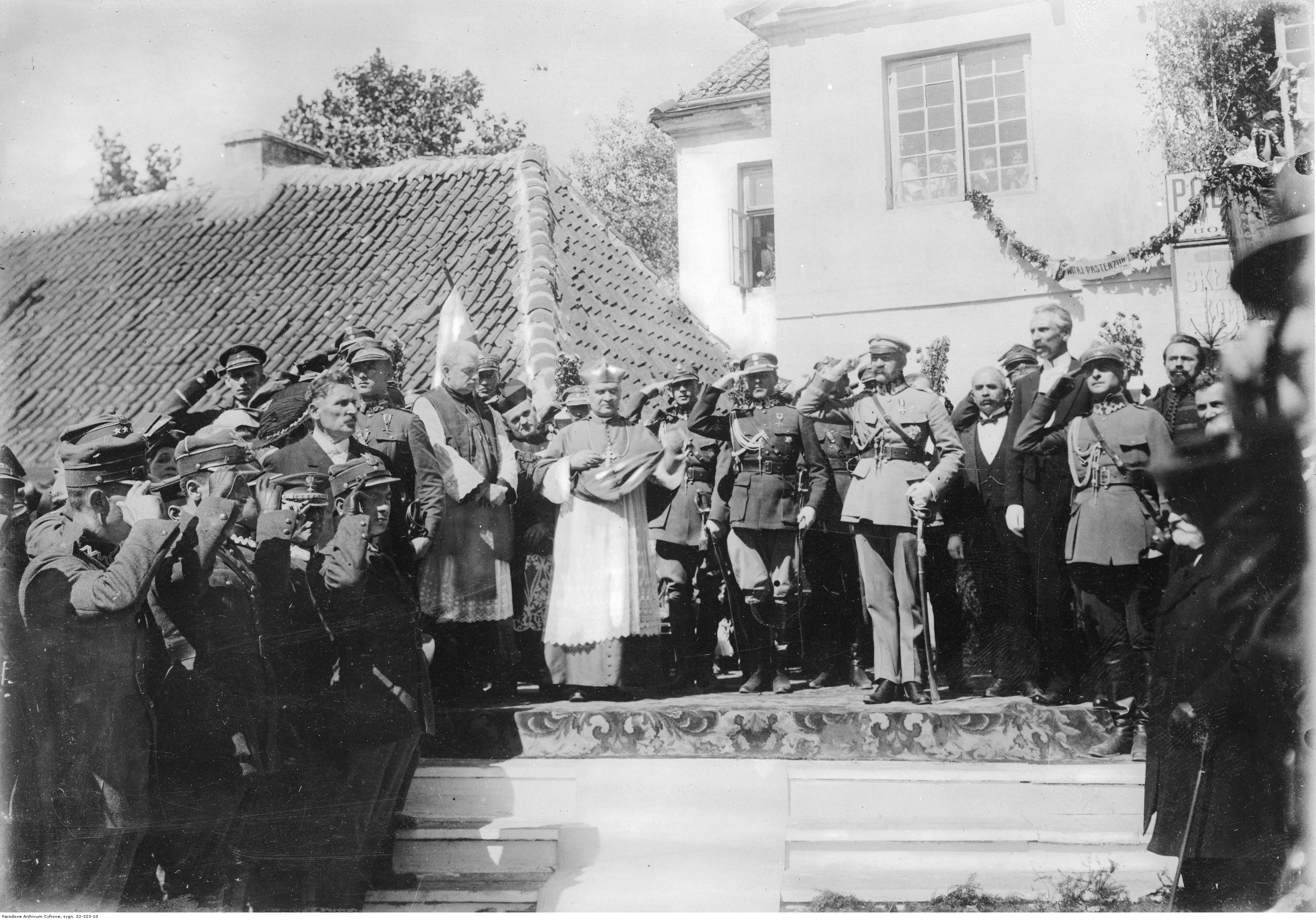
Visit of the Chief of State in Białystok on August 21, 1921. Marshal Józef Piłsudski receives the parade of the 42nd Infantry Regiment.

On March 4, 1919, the unit left Italy and went to France by train. In Voulx, the I and III battalions were combined with three instruction companies (Nos. 21, 22 and 23) composed of French officers and non-commissioned officers as well as Poles, prisoners of war from the German army and volunteers from America. From the combined subunits, 1 instructional regiment of Grenadiers - Voltiżers was organized. The unit received weapons, technical equipment and rolling stock from the 225th Reserve Infantry Regiment. In May of that year, the unit was renamed the 13th Polish Rifle Regiment and was included in the army of General Józef Haller. On May 20, the regiment began regrouping to Poland. Three days later, the first railway transport with the regiment's headquarters crossed the Germany–Poland border. After arriving in the country, the name of the unit was changed to the 13th Foot Rifle Regiment. The regiment's command and the 2nd battalion were located in Włocławek, the 1st battalion in Szpetal Górny and Lipno, and the 3rd battalion in Kowal. On September 1, after the unification of the Blue Army with the Polish Army, the unit received the name - 150th Borderland Rifle Regiment. On October 28, the regiment was named the 42nd Borderland Rifle Regiment. On January 29, 1920, the unit was renamed the 42nd Infantry Regiment for the last time.

In December 1919, the regiment's reserve battalion was stationed in Białystok.

On 30 May 1920, the reserve battalion of the 42nd Infantry Regiment founded the WKS 42 Pułk Piechoty Białystok football club, renamed to Jagiellonia Białystok a few years later.

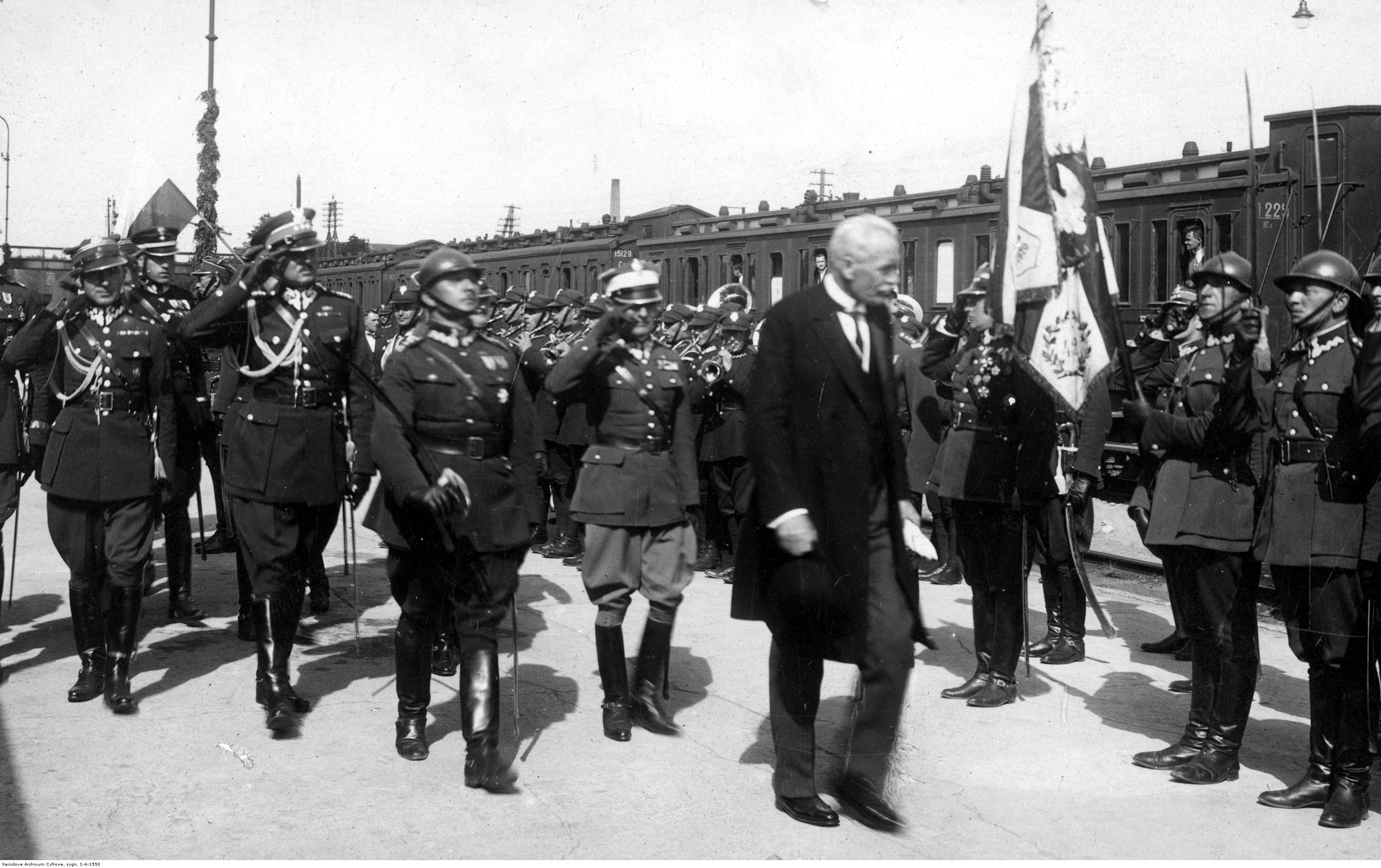
Visit of the President of Poland, Ignacy Mościcki, in Białystok on July 1, 1927. Greeting at the station - on the right, the standard-bearers of the 42nd Infantry Regiment.

After the armistice, the 2nd battalion was sent to Dawidgródek. There, it disarmed the troops of General Stanisław Bułak-Bałachowicz and returned to his parent regiment. The command, 1st and 2nd battalions were stationed in Łachwa, and the 3rd battalion in Kożangródek. From March 18, 1921, only the 2nd battalion remained in Łachwa, and the regiment was moved to Łuniniec and remained there until the end of June. In June, the 2nd battalion left by train to Białystok, the 1st battalion remained in place, and the regiment without two battalions went to Pinsk. On October 10, 1921, the regiment regrouped to the Osowiec Fortress. Only on April 27, 1922, the 42nd Infantry Regiment (without the 3rd Battalion) was transported to the area of Corps District No. I in Białystok. In Białystok, in the former barracks of the 64th Kazan Infantry Regiment, the regiment's reserve battalion had been stationed since July 1919. It was he who prepared the rooms for the reception of the parent branch.

=== Second World War ===
==== Preparations for war ====
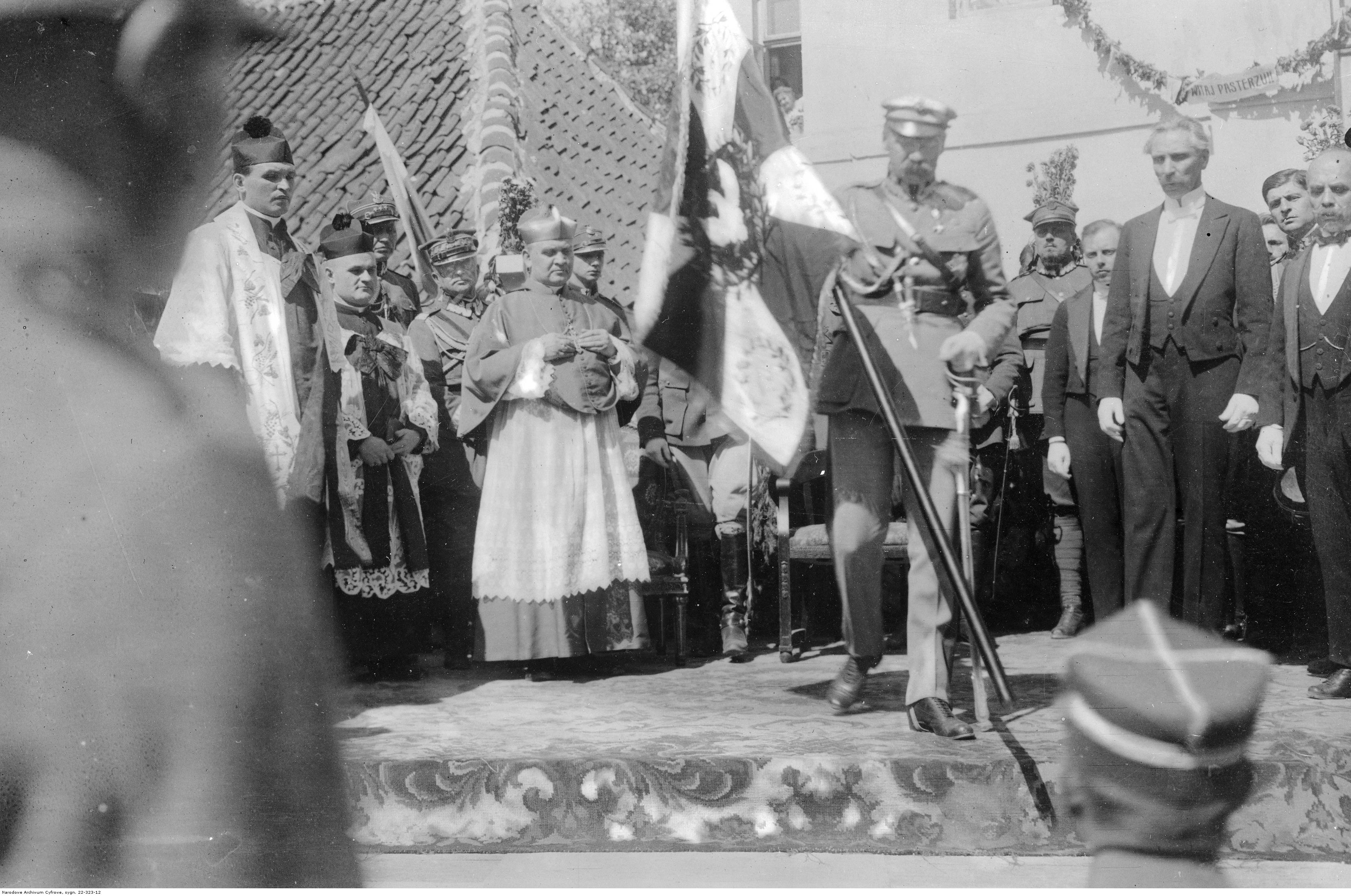
Marshal Józef Piłsudski hands over the banner of the 42nd Infantry Regiment on August 21, 1921.

On March 23, 1939, the Independent Operational Group Narew was formed under the command of Brig. Gen. Czesław Młot-Fijałkowski. The 18th Infantry Division, which was part of it, was to organize defense on the Narew - Biebrza river line and take positions between Ostrołęka and Łomża. The 42nd Infantry Regiment, reinforced with the ON "Kurpie" battalion, a squadron of the 5th Uhlan Regiment and one squadron of the 18th Pal, was to defend the crossings on the Narew in the Wojciechowice - Kamionka area.

==== Mobilization ====
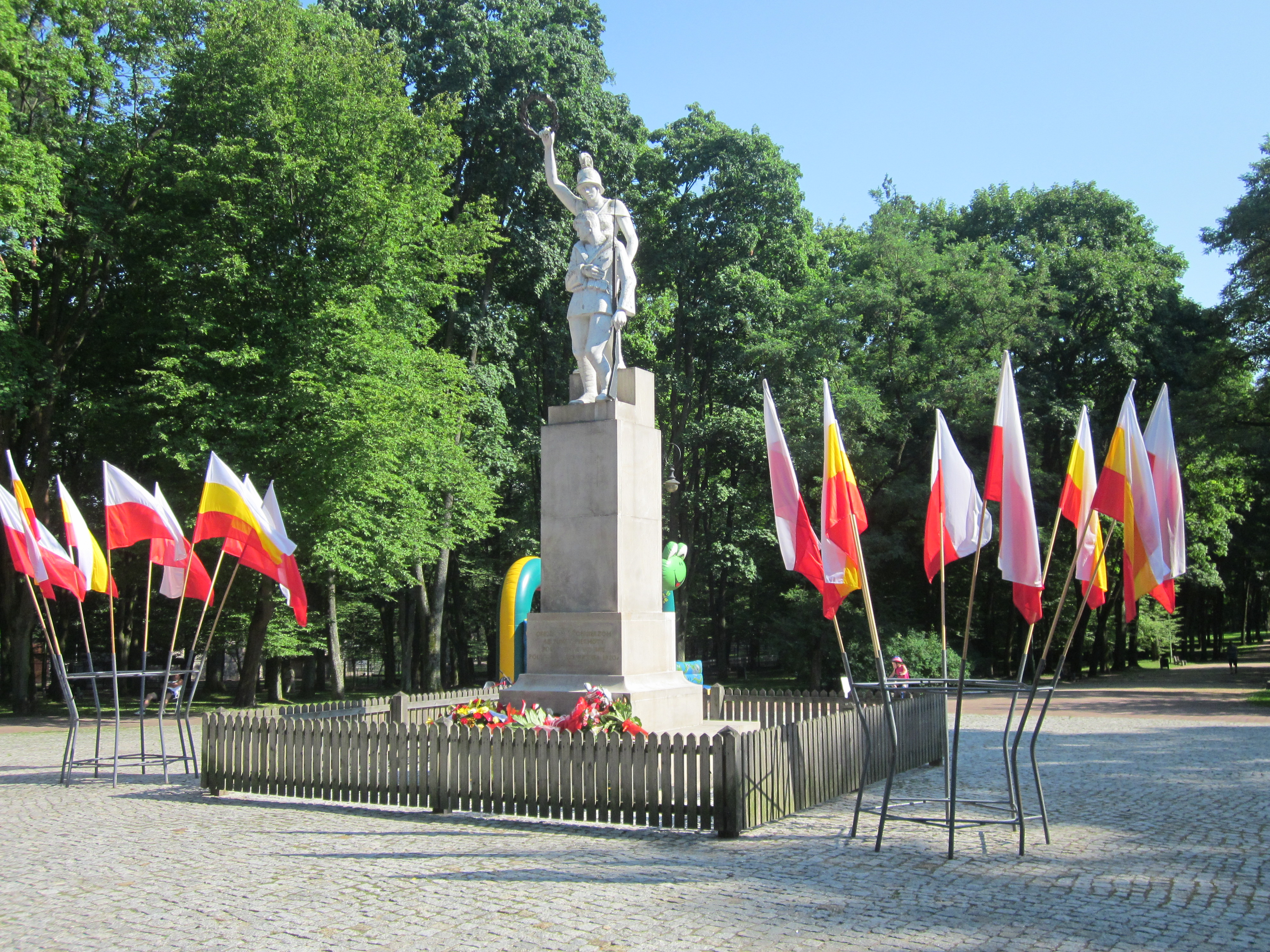
Monument to the regiment at the Constitution of 3 May Park

Emergency mobilization in the regiment began on August 24, 1939, at 6:00 a.m. in the barracks in Białystok and facilities in the city.

It generally went smoothly: the 1st battalion finished mobilization around 1.00 on August 25, the 2nd battalion in the evening of August 25, and the 3rd battalion on August 26 at around 15:00. Reservists were sent to the baths, underwent a medical examination, and then were uniformed and received equipment, weapons and ammunition. The attendance of privates was exemplary, and some reserve officers reached the regiment with a slight delay. However, there were difficulties with harnessing the collected peasant horses and carts.

After achieving mobilization readiness, the units regrouped to nearby villages: 1st battalion in Bagnówka and Zielona, 2nd battalion in Sowlany and Ciasne and 3rd battalion without the 9th rifle company in Sobolewo. On the night of August 26/27, the fully mobilized 9th Rifle Company loaded into wagons and left for Ostrołęka, from where it moved to Łodziska to ensure the concentration of the regiment. On August 27, on the road to Zielona, a Polish Army oaths and a field mass took place. On the night of August 27/28, the 1st battalion from the Białystok railway station left for Ostrołęka, and on August 28, the 2nd battalion left for Ostrołęka. On August 29, the 3rd battalion (without 9 companies) left the Białystok Fabryczny station at 17:00 to Ostrołęka. On August 30, the 42nd Infantry Regiment took up defensive positions, in accordance with the defense plan.

On site, it turned out that the combat shelters were still under construction and there were no equipped shooting positions. The 3rd battalion took up a forward position in the area of Łodziska - Olszewka. The 1st battalion defended Ostrołęka, the road bridge through Narew to Myszyniec and Warsaw, and the railway bridge to Chorzele - Szczytno. His 3rd company took positions on the left wing near the railway bridge, the 1st company in the center in the area of the road bridge, cemetery and prison, and the 2nd company on the right wing up to Wojciechowice. On August 31, the regiment's positions were inspected by the divisional infantry commander, Col. Aleksander Hertel.

==== Combat operations ====
World War II began when at 4:45 AM, German planes entered Polish territory and began bombing transport hubs and cities. I/42 Infantry Regiment was deployed on the Wojciechowice-Dzbenin section with all companies in the first line of defense. The 1st battalion secured the bridges on the Narew River, with the 3rd Rifle Company in the area of the railway bridge, and the 1st Rifle Company in the area of the road bridge. II/42nd Infantry Regiment defended the Dzbenin-Kamianka section, defending the Narew River with the 4th and 5th rifle companies, and had the 6th rifle company in reserve 3 kilometers southeast of Ostrołęka. III/42 Infantry Regiment on the northern edge of Łodziska, with the 8th and 9th rifle companies on both sides of the Ostrołęka-Łodziska road, and with the 7th company in reserve. The main forces of the 42nd Infantry Regiment were grouped on the Narew line, with the 3rd battalion advanced in the foreground in the area of Łodziska. Before him, on the state border, there was a separate unit in Myszyniec, consisting of a unit (company) of the Border Protection Corps, two companies of National Defense and the 1st squadron of the 5th Uhlan Regiment.

==== Units formed ====
===== Marching battalion =====
It was organized until September 3, 1939, in the regiment's barracks in Białystok. Then he moved to the village of Bagnówka. Lieutenant Ignacy Stachowiak became the commander of the battalion. Due to the threat to Białystok from approaching Wehrmacht, the marching battalion of the 42nd Infantry Regiment was subordinated to the city defense command, which was held by Lt. Col. Zygmunt Szafranowski, and the chief of staff was Capt. Tadeusz Kosiński. On September 11, the 42nd Infantry Regiment advanced in defense. The 2nd rifle company with the marching platoon of the 14th horse artillery division (two guns) took up positions on Wysoki Stoczek. 1st rifle company near the cemetery of St. Rocha. 3rd Rifle Company in reserve. In the area of Żółtki, Choroszcz, an improvised collective rifle company with heavy machine guns from the 38th anti-tank machine gun company was deployed. under the command of Lieutenant Witold Kiewlicz.

On September 13, units of the Lötzen Infantry Brigade approached Białystok. On September 14, the Lötzen Infantry Brigade attacked the positions of Lieutenant Kiewlicz's assembly company in the village of Żółtki. After several hours of fighting, the company withdrew to Białystok. On September 15, around 9:00 a.m., along the road from Żółtki, units of "Lötzen" Brigade approached the defensive positions of the 2nd Rifle Company. With the support of machine guns and two cannons, the German attack was stopped. With strong support from artillery, aviation and armoured cars, it was pushed from Wysoki Stoczek. Counterattack of the reserve platoon under the command of Sgt. cadet Antoni Malecki stopped the further attack of the German infantry and drove him away from Wysoki Stoczek. German troops bypassed the defense of the marching battalion of the 42nd Infantry Regiment from the flanks, pushing the defense of the squadrons of the 2nd Uhlan Regiment under the command of Capt. Sołtykiewicza on the northern wing of defense in the Pietrasz area.

Under the protection of uhlans from the 2nd regiment. and a guard company from the 32nd guard battalion, the marching battalion of the 42nd Infantry Regiment withdrew on the orders of Lt. Col. Zygmunt Szafranowski from Białystok. The battalion withdrew to Królowy Most and further to Wołkowysk. In Wołkowysk, the battalion became part of the "Wołkowysk" Group of Brig. Gen. Wacław Przeździecki. On September 17, the marching battalion of the 42nd Infantry Regiment was bombed by the Luftwaffe, then traveled by rail through Lida to Vilnius in order to strengthen the organized defense of the city. While the transport with the battalion was stopping at the railway station in Bieniakonie (in today's Belarus), information came about the entry of Red Army. On the morning of September 19, after reaching the Landwarowo railway station, the battalion received information about the occupation of Vilnius by Soviet troops. Therefore, the marching battalion of the 42nd Infantry Regiment was unloaded from the railway transport and the battalion commander disbanded the unit.

===== Surplus Collection Unit =====
From the surplus reservists, professional staff, horses, remains of weapons and equipment remaining in the barracks, the Surplus Collection Unit of the 42nd Infantry Regiment was organized under the command of Major Stefan Wolski. OZN 42 Infantry Regiment was sent to the Reserve Center of the 18th Infantry Division in Biała Podlaska. After joining the OZ, the 18th Infantry Division shared its fate. The planned commander of OZ 18 Infantry Division was Lt. Col. Franciszek Faix, peaceful deputy commander of the 42nd Infantry Regiment, but for undetermined reasons he did not take his command.
