= Osiedle Mickiewicza, Białystok =

Osiedle (city district) in Białystok, Poland

Mickiewicza
- District (osiedle) of Białystok
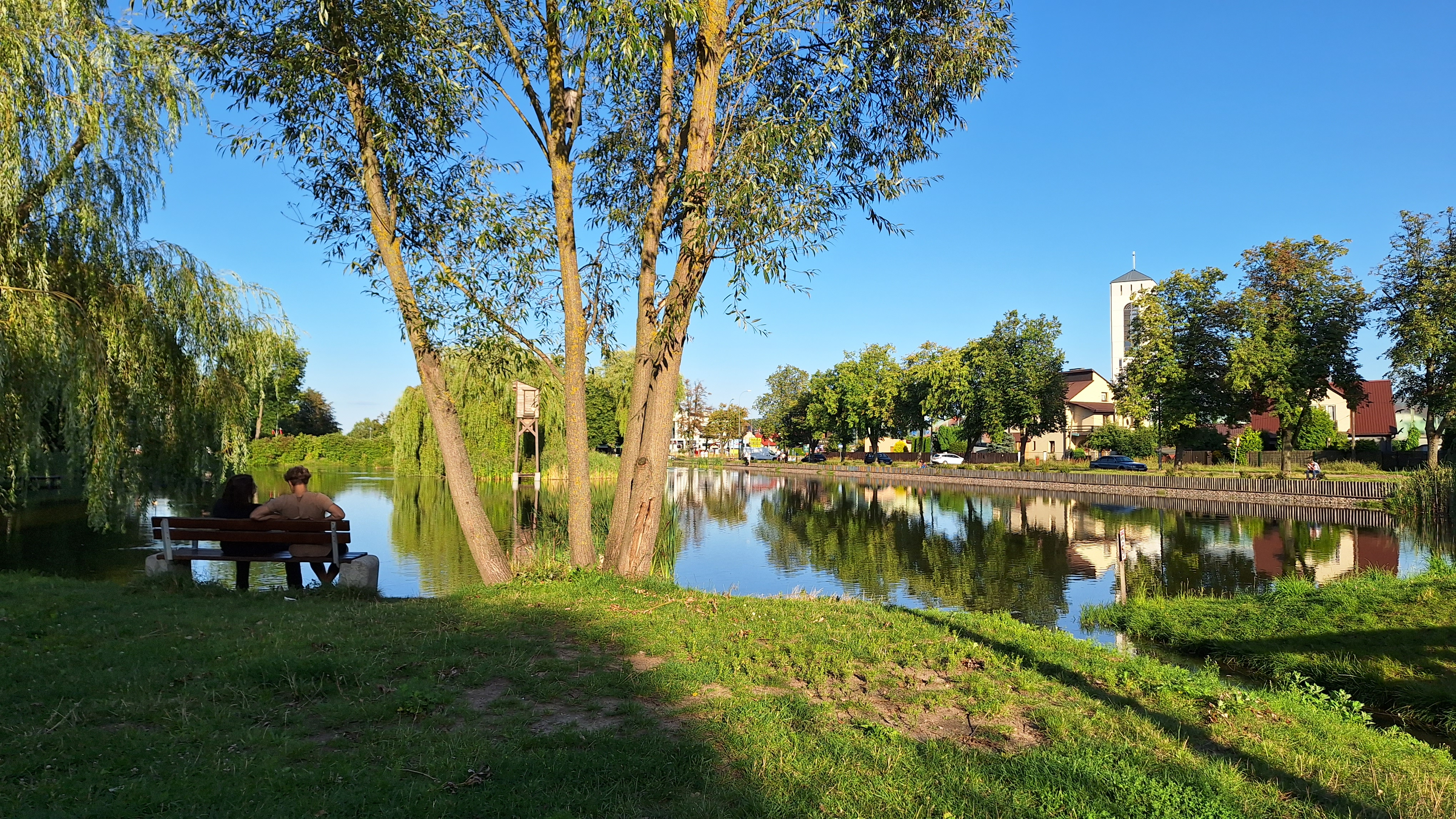

- Location of Mickiewicza District within Białystok
- Coordinates: 53°07′15″N 23°10′28″E
- Country: Poland
- Voivodeship: Podlaskie
- City: Białystok

Area
  - Total: 3.734 km^{2} (1.442 sq mi)
- Time zone: UTC+1 (CET)
  - Summer (DST): UTC+2 (CEST)

Osiedle Mickiewicza is one of the districts in the Polish city of Białystok. It is located in the south-central part of the city and is named after poet Adam Mickiewicz.

== History ==
Significant part of the district is occupied by the Zwierznicki Forest which was used for several centuries as undeveloped territories adjustcent to the Branicki Palace. In the 19th century the area became under development with the construction of the Nowik Factories. In the second half of the 19th century, the Russian authorities built a road to Baranowicze, using part of the former Slonim route, today's Mickiewicza Street. During the 19th century fields and meadows were urbanized over several decades, sold off, divided or consolidated and transformed either into plots designated for residential development or for factories.

In the interwar period was developed on the basis of a detailed development plan from 1932 prepared by the Białystok City Council. The area of the estate, approximately five hectares in size, stretched at that time on the area located near the Nowik factory and two ponds marking the former Warsaw route, in the vicinity of which the Nowe tavern was located in the 18th century. In the 1870s, a machine and casting factory of Adolf Święcicki and Antoni Wieczorek operated nearby, referred to as the Krzywe Settlement. According to the original plans, the estate was to be one of the first examples of a satellite estate in Białystok, modelled on the garden city concept developed by the British urban planner Ebenezer Howard. In the interwar period, the most densely built-up part of the estate was the area between Jagiellońska and Drewniana streets (including Folwarczna, Bednarska, Lwowska streets). The layout of the district's main routes (Mickiewicza, Jagiellońska, Pod Krzywa and Zwierzyniecka streets) has been preserved to this day, between which parallel estate streets run. A large part of the pre-war buildings has been preserved in this part, with the dominant feature being the building of the former primary school, maintained in the spirit of native architecture characteristic of the 1920s. However, most of the pre-war buildings were demolished, rebuilt and modernized. Among the notable buildings that have survived are wooden villa at 7 Pod Krzywą Street, built in 1934 in the functionalist style, which housed the first Białystok radio station just after the war. In addition 22 Gdańska Street, built in the style of functional modernism. Among the buildings on Pod Krzywą Street, the wooden electric mill (at no. 11/1), built in 1947 entered into the register of monuments of the Podlaskie Voivodeship in 2010.

In the spring of 1945, the administration of the penal and investigative prison in Białystok signed a lease agreement with the City Council for 10.5 ha of land located at the then Szosa Zambrowska (modern Ciołkowskiego street), in the area of Letniska street. The lease agreement was extended several times, at least until 1947. According to witness accounts, as well as intelligence documents of underground independence organizations, this area was used for individual burials of victims of communist crimes, and perhaps also for executions. Residents mark some of these places with images of the Mother of God attached to trees.

== Sports ==
Zwierzyniec Stadium, the training ground of the athletics club Podlasie Białystok, is located in the neighbourhood.
