= Osiedle Bagnówka, Białystok =

District and historical village in Białystok

Bagnówka
- District (osiedle) of Białystok
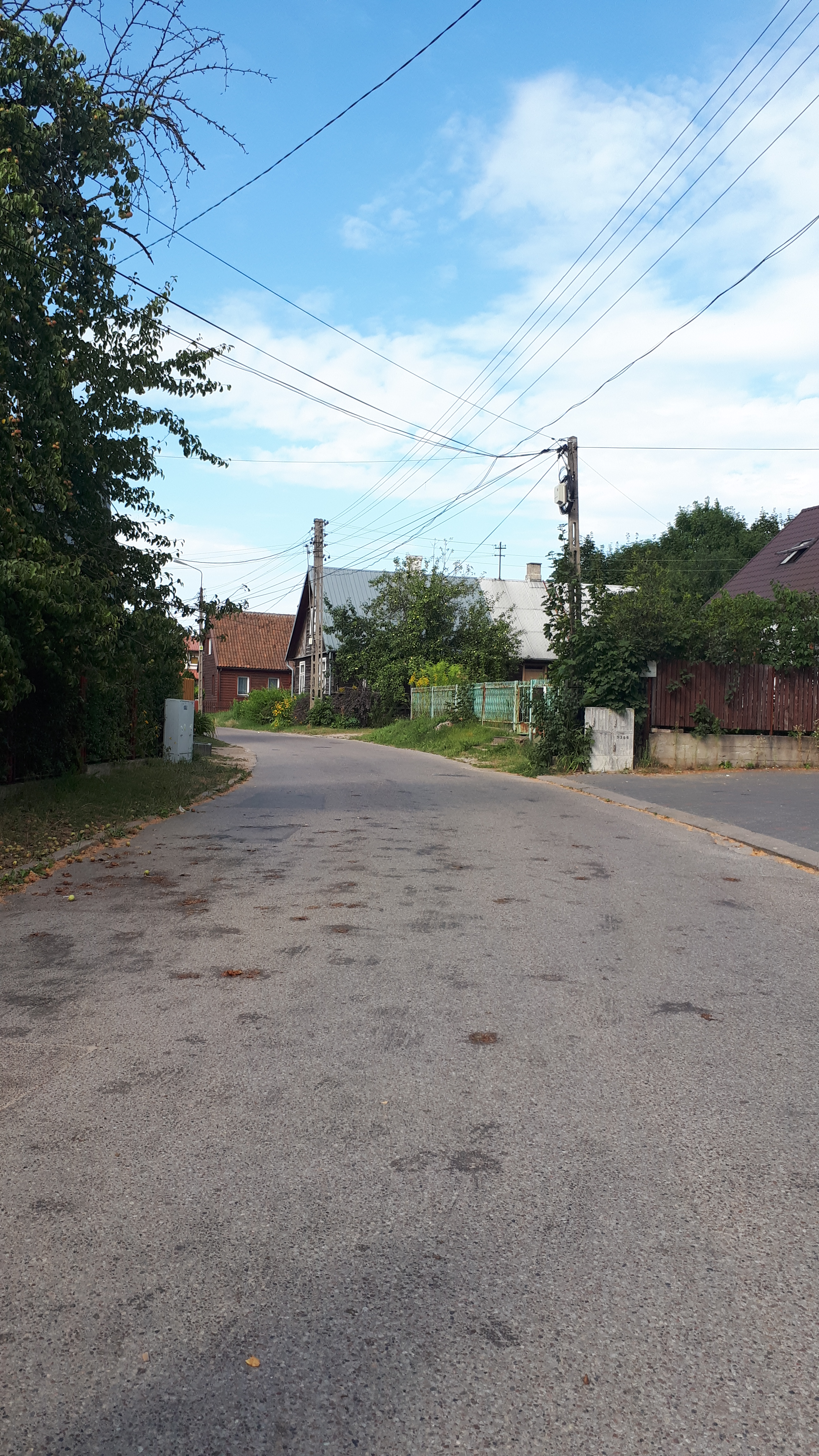
- View of Kluka Street in Bagnówka, August 2022

- Location of Bagnówka within Białystok
- Coordinates: 53°09′02″N 23°13′05″E
- Country: Poland
- Voivodeship: Podlaskie
- City: Białystok

Area
  - Total: 3.072 km^{2} (1.186 sq mi)
- Time zone: UTC+1 (CET)
  - Summer (DST): UTC+2 (CEST)
- Area code: +48 85
- Vehicle registration: BI

Osiedle Bagnówka is a neighbourhood in the city of Białystok in Poland. It is located on the eastern outskirts of the city. It borders with Wygoda, Jaroszówka and the village of Sowlany. The historical part of the district stretches along Jana Krzysztofa Kluka Street. To the east of it there is housing estate of single-family houses in Puchalskiego Street. Dolistówka river runs in the neighbourhood.

== Overview ==
The district has a layout in which the sides of rectangular ownership plots are narrow from the side of the road, but very elongated in the direction perpendicular to the street. From the front there are residential buildings, while farm buildings are located deep inside the property. It can be assumed that with the passage of time, new houses were erected in place of old houses, so the shape of the village itself has not changed much since the end of the 19th century. Relics of the former village along Kluka Street on the section between Mościckiego and Kosińskiego streets. The street here follows the course of a country road, it also has a characteristic layout, and along it there are old houses reminding of the history of this place.

== History ==
Formerly an independent village. Until 1954 it was part of the Gmina Dojlidy, then 1954–1971 in the Grabówka Gromada, and in 1972 in the Zaścianki Gromada.

According to the 1921 census, the population of Bagnówka was 97.7% Polish and 2.1% Belarusian.

On January 1, 1973, it was incorporated into Białystok, until 2004 a separate housing estate. In the years 2004-2020 the territories of the district were administratively assigned to the Wygoda and Jaroszówka districts.

In 1975 a detailed spatial plan was approved, for the construction of single houses in the district.

In 2020 residents of the district had complained about the lack of street lighting in the area.

On January 25, 2021, a resolution of the Białystok City Council was adopted to create a new Bagnówka district. The change entered into force on February 16, 2021.

According to the provisions of the preservation plan approved in 2023, only single-family houses are to be built in the protection zone, with a maximum of two storeys above ground, with the second storey in the form of an attic.
