= Osiedle Piasta I, Białystok =

Piasta I
- District (osiedle) of Białystok
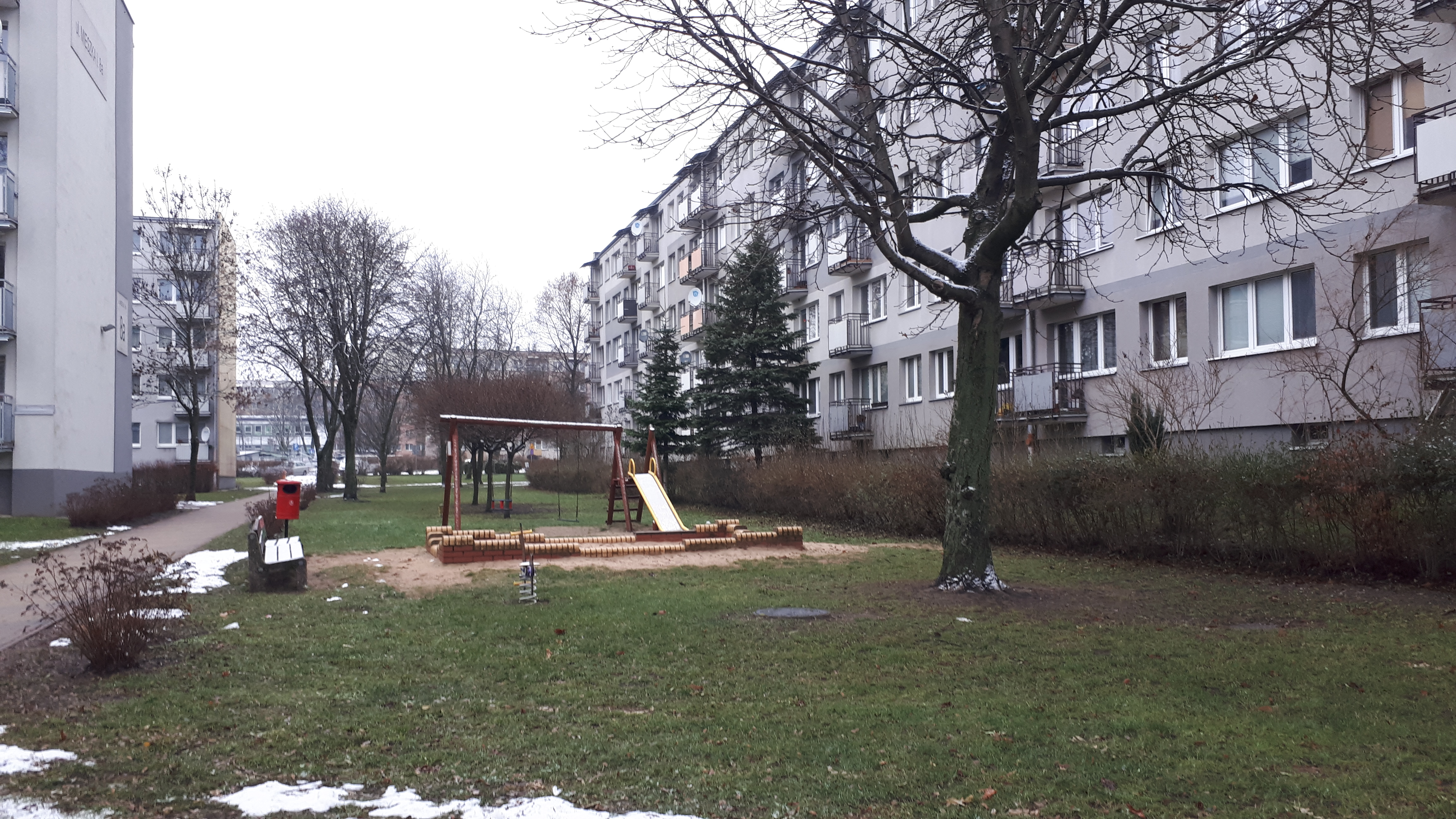

- Location of Piasta I within Białystok
- Coordinates: 53°08′00″N 23°11′36″E
- Country: Poland
- Voivodeship: Podlaskie
- City: Białystok

Area
  - Total: 0.956 km^{2} (0.369 sq mi)
- Time zone: UTC+1 (CET)
  - Summer (DST): UTC+2 (CEST)
- Area code: +48 85
- Vehicle registration: BI
- Website: www.bialystok.pl

Osiedle Piasta I is one of the districts of the Polish city of Białystok. Named after the royal Piast dynasty.
