= Osiedle Przydworcowe, Białystok =

Przydworcowe
- District (osiedle) of Białystok
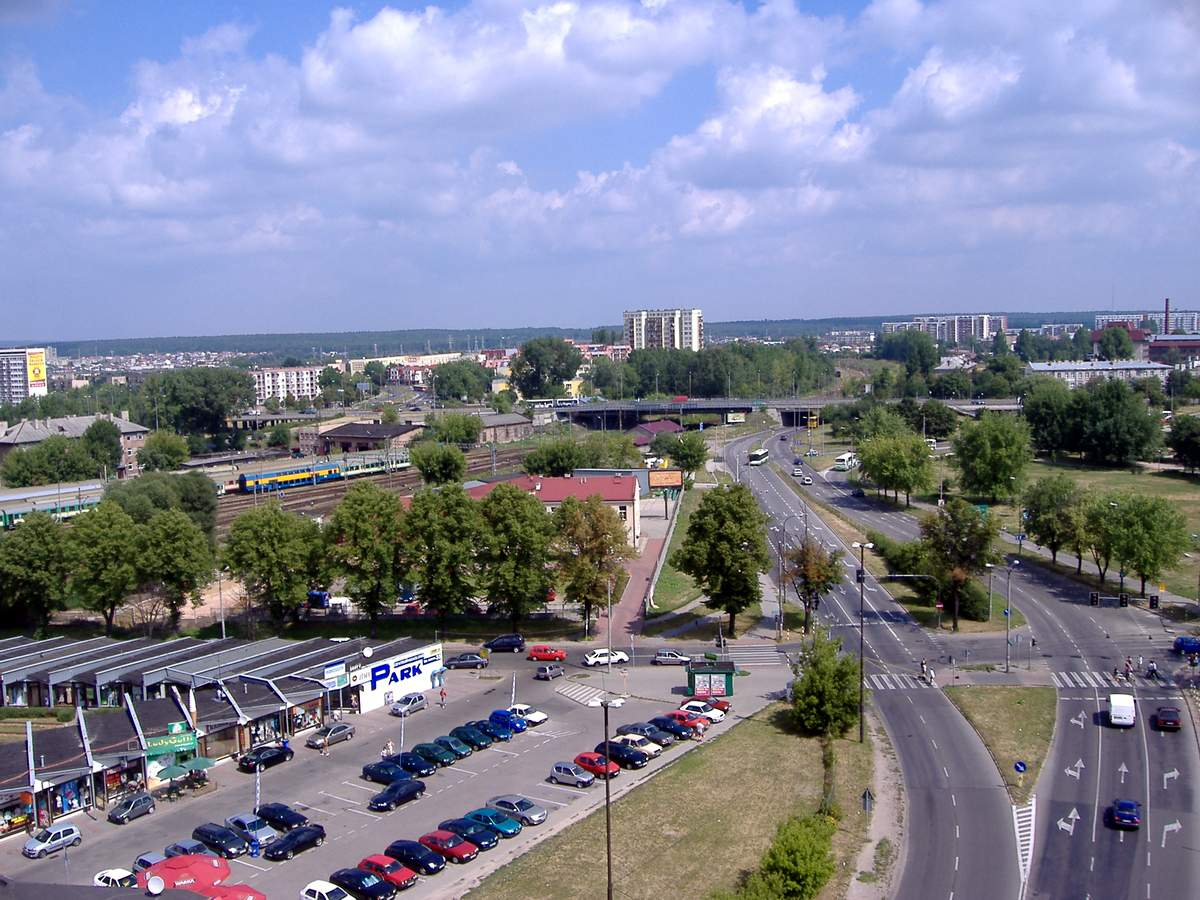
- Bohaterów Monte Casino Street

- Location of Osiedle Przydworcowe within Białystok
- Coordinates: 53°7′46″N 23°8′19″E
- Country: Poland
- Voivodeship: Podlaskie
- County/City: Białystok

Area
  - Total: 1.492 km^{2} (0.576 sq mi)
- Time zone: UTC+1 (CET)
  - Summer (DST): UTC+2 (CEST)
- Postal code: 15-xxx
- Area code: +48 85
- Website: http://www.bialystok.pl

Osiedle Przydworcowe is one of the districts of the Polish city of Białystok.
