= Osiedle Bacieczki, Białystok =

Bacieczki
- District (osiedle) of Białystok
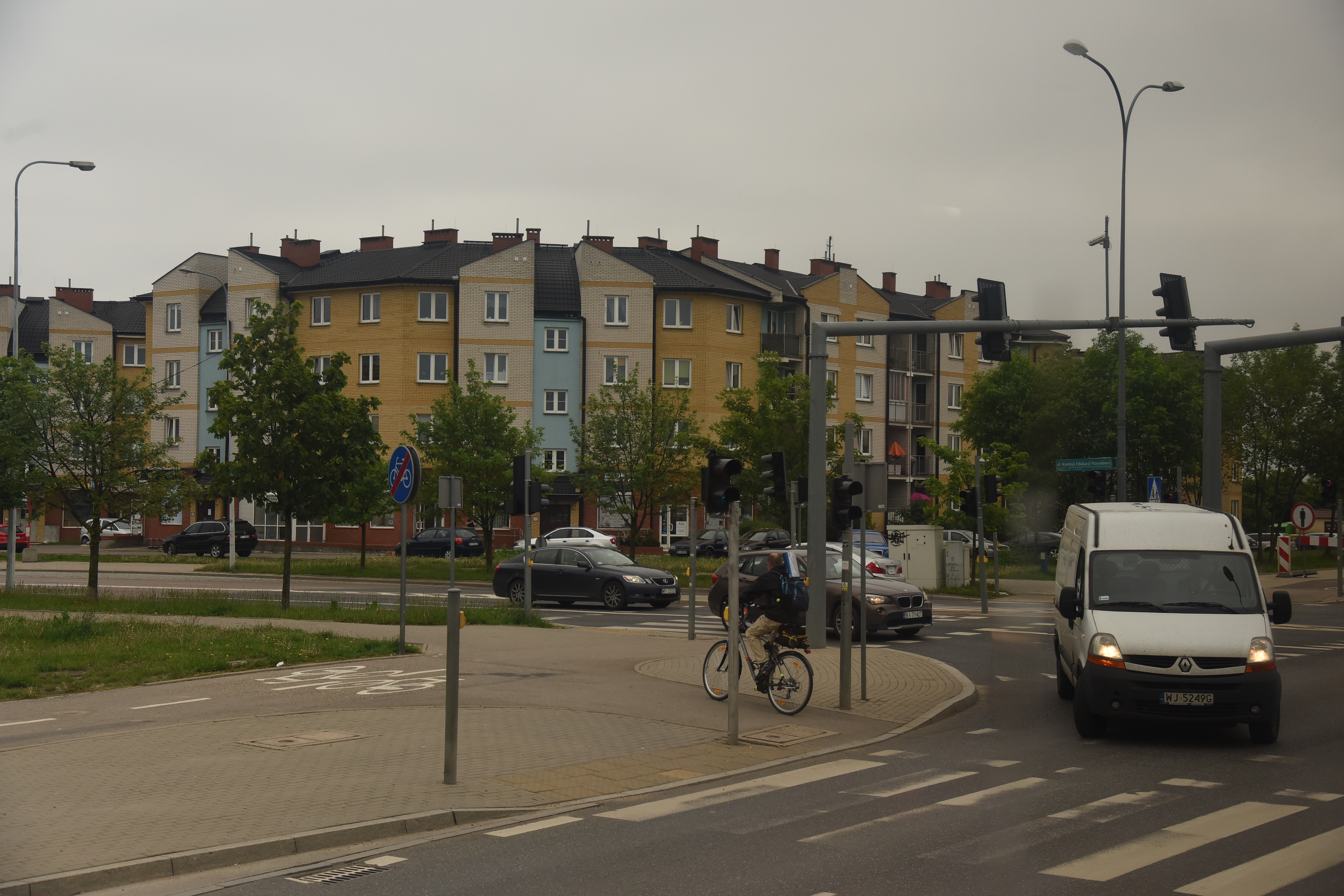
- Komisji Edukacji Narodowej Street in Bacieczki

- Location of Bacieczki District within Białystok
- Coordinates: 53.150°N 23.100°E
- Country: Poland
- Voivodeship: Podlaskie
- County/City: Białystok
- Incorporated: 1954

Area
  - Total: 2.964 km^{2} (1.144 sq mi)
- Time zone: UTC+1 (CET)
  - Summer (DST): UTC+2 (CEST)
- Area code: +48 85
- Website: http://www.bialystok.pl

Bacieczki is one of the districts of the Polish city of Białystok. The elevation is 511 feet (156 m).

== History ==
The first records about Bacieczki date back to the 16th century. It was founded as a grange around 1533. According to surviving records, together with Fasty it belonged to the monastery in Supraśl. Information about the "wooden church in the Bacieczki farm" erected from the foundation of Prince Aleksander Chodkiewicz comes from the same period. This church was called St. Jan Theolog, the heavenly patron of the founder's father, Ivan Chodkiewicz, who died in Turkish captivity. The church in Bacieczki existed until 1773, when for unknown reasons it was demolished and the material obtained from it was used to expand the church in Zawyki (this church has survived to this day and currently functions as a cemetery Roman Catholic church). Papers from the early 19th century mentioning the existence of two villages, Dojlidzkie and Ogrodniczki on the territory of the neighborhood.

In the place where today there is a space neighbourhood (called so because of the street names) was the Bacieczki manor. It is located in the area of Produkcyjna, Saturna and Neptuna streets.

In the 19th century, a German factory colony began in the district's territory, around Produkcyjna Street. It was founded by the Moes family, which ran its business in Choroszcz. The history of the settlement is connected with the fact that the owners of the textile factory in Choroszcz brought twenty-two families of German weavers in the 19th century. Each of them received land, and small wooden weaving factories were created in wooden houses, some of which have survived to this day.

From these times comes the Evangelical-Augsburg cemetery formerly located outside the settlement (today it is located in the forest at Produkcyjna Street, just behind the Auchan hypermarket). At the turn of the century, Bacieczki and Kolonia Bacieczki had a total of 204 inhabitants. It was the seat of the commune, and there was also a school. In Białystok, Bacieczki did not yet appear in 1919, but only at the next expansion of the city's administrative boundaries in 1954. It happened pursuant to the regulation of October 1953. The following disappeared from the administrative map: clusters of Bacieczki, Kolonia Bacieczki, Korycin (today around Niska Street in Leśna Dolina), as well as the nearby town of Starosielce, whose areas adjoined Białystok.

The third, much younger, historical site in the area is the "Fasty" Cotton Combine and was constructed in the early 1950s. The combine took up the area between today's Przędzalniana, Produkcyjna streets and the road to Ełk. The factory took its name from the nearby village of Fasty. Its history dates back to 1529. The first settlers were to be the family of peasants – Chwastów (a.k.a. Fastów).

In the Second Polish Republic, the village was the seat of the Białostoczek Gmina.

According to the 1921 census, the village of Bacieczki had 49 houses and was inhabited by 258 people, among whom 210 declared an Orthodox denomination, while the remaining 48 were Roman Catholic. At the same time, all residents of the then Bacieczki declared Polish nationality. During this period, the village was subject to the Orthodox parish of the Exaltation of the Holy Cross in nearby Fasty.

In 1929, there was one brickyard in the village, a mill of Zakłady Przemysłowych S.A. a confectionery shop, two pubs, two grocery stores and one with cold cuts. There was one midwife, a carpenter, wheelwright, blacksmith, carpenter and shoemaker.

In 1933, 633 people lived in the village.

In 1941–1943 in the forest near Bacieczki, the Germans murdered over 3,000. people. Currently, there is a Monument to the place of a mass execution in the Bacieczki Forest.

In the years 1945–1954 the town was the seat of the Bacieczki Gmina. In 1954 the village was incorporated into the boundaries of Białystok. Currently, it is a residential district consisting of blocks of Towarzystwo Budownictwa Spółdzielczy (TBS) and single-family houses.

In a plan issued in 1966 on the occasion of the Millennium of the Polish State, only a few main streets in this area are marked. These are: Szosa Ełcka (today the Narodowych Sił Zbrojnych Street), North-Regional Road (today its fragment at the height of the TBS (Kleeberga Street), Przędzalniana, Tkacka and Bacieczka. There was also a road from the Biała River to the outskirts it partly coincides with the course of today's Komisji Edukacji Narodowe Street (on the fragment from the Church of Our Lady Queen of Families to the meadows on the Biała River). On the orthophotomap from 1976, the village buildings of Bacieczki are perfectly visible. There is also a housing estate of semi-detached houses built by the Pionier I Association on the north-west side of Bacieczki Street, as well as erected houses on the side of the school at Strażacka Street. In the place of the TBS there are long fields. In the corner, between the outskirts and the exit to Ełk, there is a farm that somehow survived to this day. On the southern side of the outlet to Warsaw, there is a vast green complex – Bacieczki Forest.
