= Podlasie Białystok =

Athletics club based in Białystok, Poland

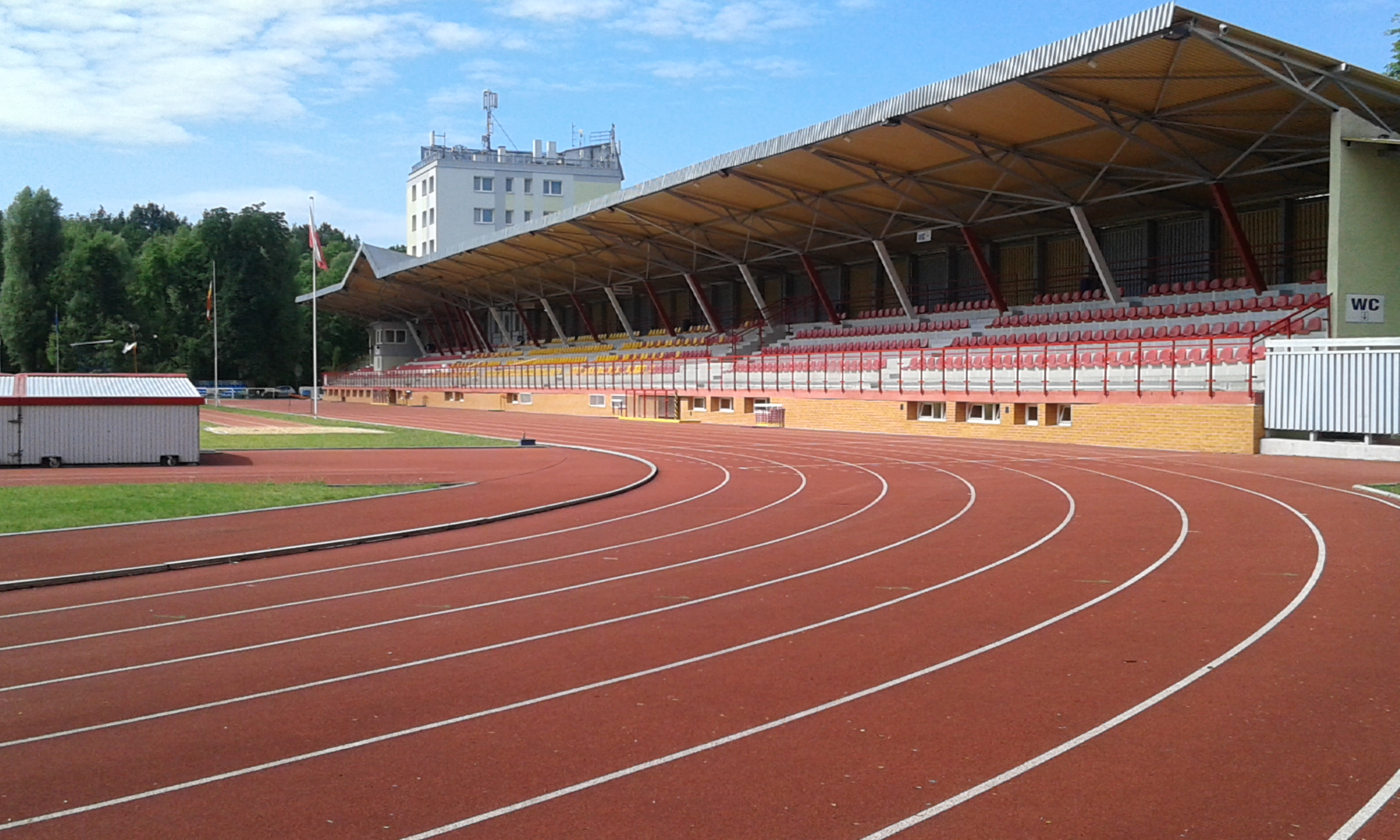
- Zwierzyniec Stadium, the club's training ground
- Full name: Klub Sportowy Podlasie Białystok
- Founded: 1960; 65 years ago
- Ground: Zwierzyniec Stadium
- Location: Białystok, Poland
- Chairman: Tomasz Dąbrowski
- Website: http://www.kspodlasie.pl

Klub Sportowy Podlasie Białystok (English: Podlasie Białystok Sports Club) is a Polish athletics club based in Białystok. It is one of the top athletics clubs in Poland, multiple times Polish Club Champion.

The club's training ground, Zwierzyniec Stadium, is located in the Osiedle Mickiewicza neighbourhood of Białystok.

== Honours ==
- Polish Club Champions:
  - winners: 2011, 2012, 2013, 2014, 2016, 2018
  - runners-up: 2008, 2010, 2015, 2019, 2021
  - third place: 2020, 2022, 2023
