= Osiedle Bema, Białystok =

Osiedle Bema
- District (osiedle) of Białystok
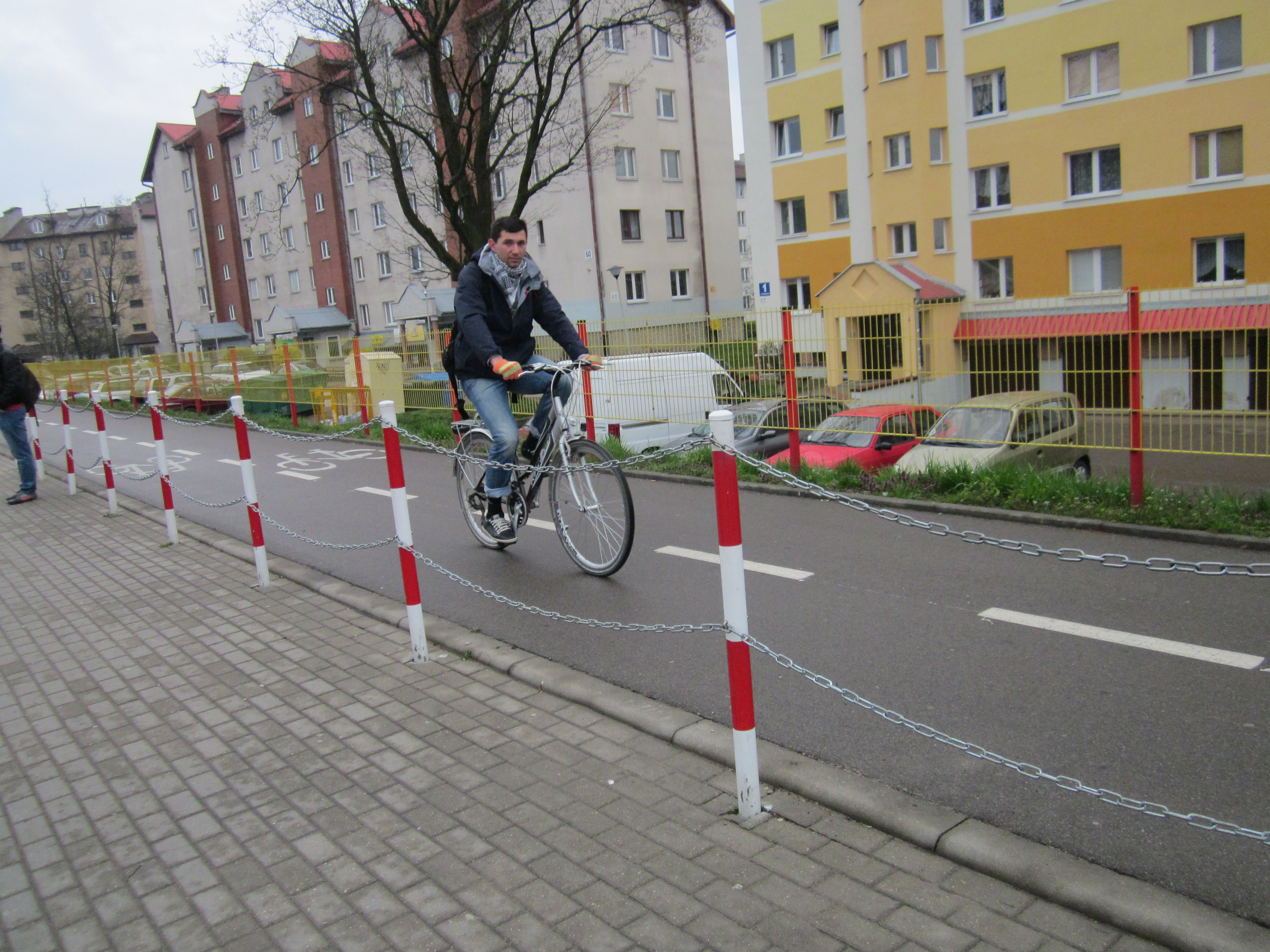
- Wiejska Street in the district

- Location of Osiedle Bema within Białystok
- Coordinates: 53°07′14″N 23°08′01″E
- Country: Poland
- Voivodeship: Podlaskie
- City: Białystok

Area
  - Total: 1.354 km^{2} (0.523 sq mi)
- Time zone: UTC+1 (CET)
  - Summer (DST): UTC+2 (CEST)
- Area code: +48 85
- Vehicle registration: BI

Osiedle Bema is one of the districts of the Polish city of Białystok. It is named after General Józef Bem, national hero of Poland.
