= Osiedle Kawaleryjskie, Białystok =

Kawaleryjskie
- District (osiedle) of Białystok
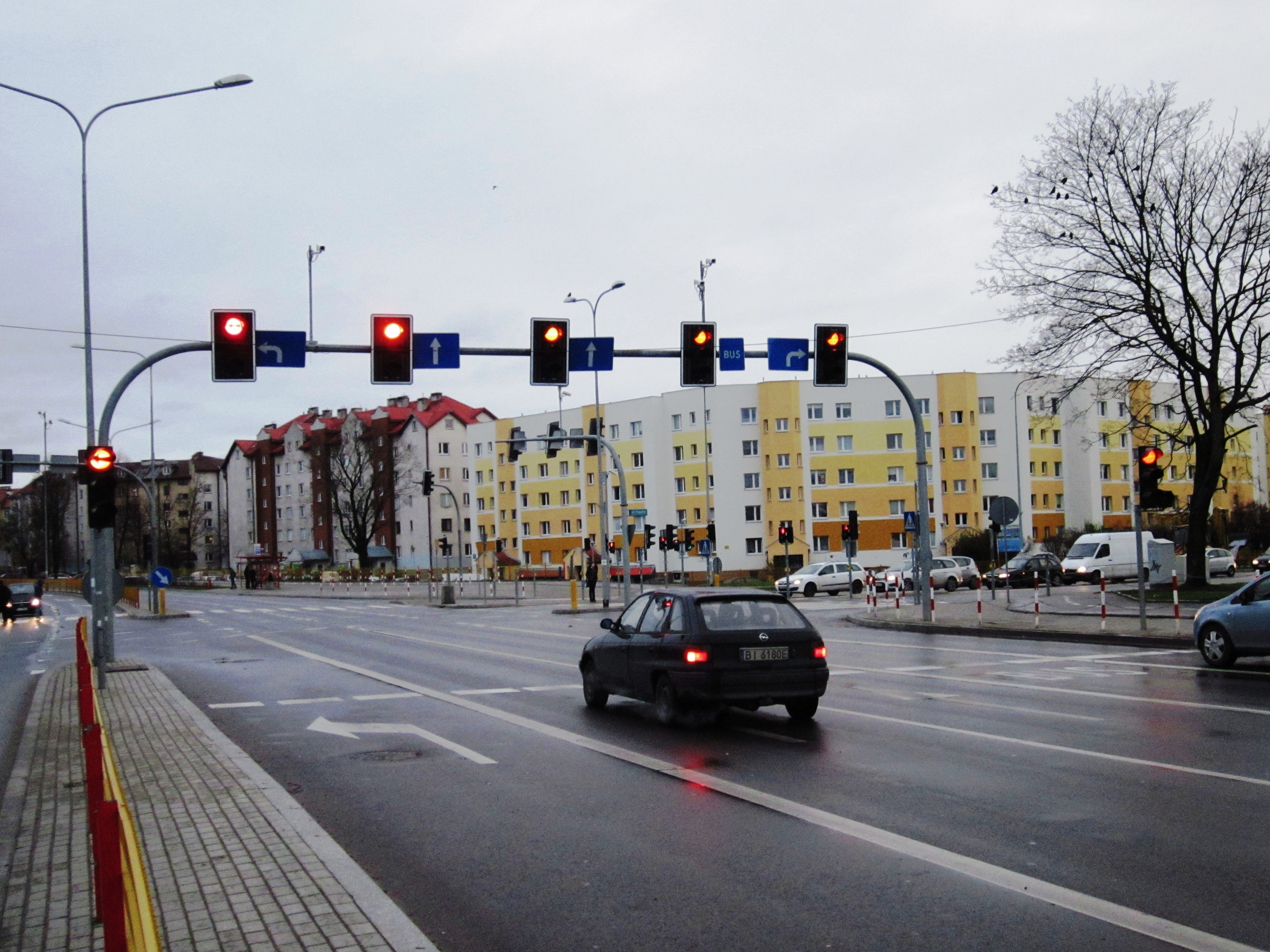

- Location of Kawaleryjskie District within Białystok
- Coordinates: 53°06′33″N 23°08′24″E
- Country: Poland
- Voivodeship: Podlaskie
- City: Białystok

Area
  - Total: 1.684 km^{2} (0.650 sq mi)

Osiedle Kawaleryjskie is one of the districts of the Polish city of Białystok. Osiedle Kawaleryjskie was called Nowe Miasto 2 (New City 2) until 2002.
