= Osiedle Wysoki Stoczek, Białystok =

Wysoki Stoczek
- District (osiedle) of Białystok
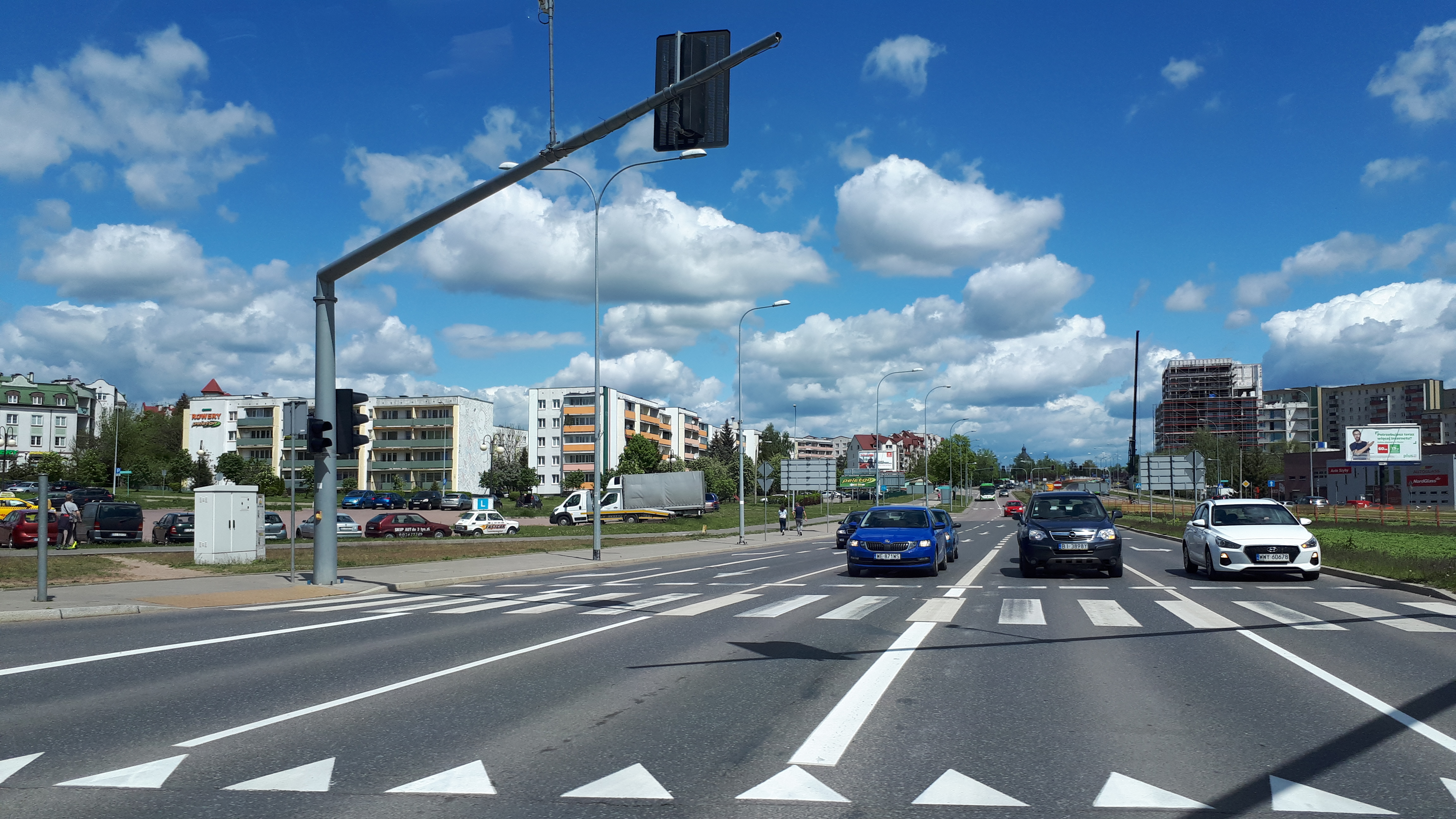
- Aleja Konstytucji 3 Maja in the district

- Location of Wysoki Stoczek within Białystok
- Coordinates: 53°08′41″N 23°06′42″E
- Country: Poland
- Voivodeship: Podlaskie
- County/City: Białystok
- Incorporated: 10 May 1919

Area
  - Total: 1.946 km^{2} (0.751 sq mi)
- Time zone: UTC+1 (CET)
  - Summer (DST): UTC+2 (CEST)
- Area code: +48 85
- Website: http://www.bialystok.pl

Wysoki Stoczek is one of the districts of Białystok in Poland.

== History ==
The district's name preserves the name of the village that was located in the northern part of the district. In the second half of the 18th century, Wysokistoczek was part of the Wysokie Stoczek manor farm belonging to Jan Klemens Branicki. There was a small palace and two pavilions in the territory, built on the edge of the peak and the southern slope of the elevation descending towards the bend of the Biała River valley. The nearby fishery enterprise was located on the southern edge of the marshy valley of this river.

The southern part of the district was the location of a village called Ogrodniczki, which preserved in the name of one of the streets located in that area. In the second half of the 18th century, Ogrodniki was part of the Wysokie Stockie farmstead. At that time, it had only six farms and, unlike other villages, it did not have arable land, only gardens. At the end of the 18th century, Ogrodniki was a single-manor settlement located on the northern bank of the Biała River, on the southwestern edge of the Fichten Wald, known in Polish as Wesołowski Forest. At the turn of the 19th and 20th centuries, the settlement was called Ogrodniki Wysokostockie and belonged to the cloth manufacturer Herman Commichau. Together with the land of the Antoniuk settlement, the agricultural land of Ogrodniki Wysokostockie covered 83 tithes (approx. 90.7 ha).

The areas of Wysoki Stoczek and Ogrodniczki were annexed to Białystok on May 10, 1919. The spatial layout of the manor and fishery enterprise was completely erased by the contemporary development of Białystok. In the place of the manor there are currently multi-family blocks at Jana Pawła II Avenue no. 59 and 59A-F. In the place of fishery enterprise, the buildings of Primary School no. 49 are located. The spatial layout of Ogrodniki Wysokostockie has been partially preserved in the layout of Ogrodniczki Street.

At the end of the 1970s, Housing Cooperative "Rodzina Kolejowa" started building the first part of the district, then known as 'Wysoki Stoczek Południe', in the areas of Scaleniowa, Fiedorowicza and Gromadzka streets. In accordance with the resolution of the meeting of Members' Representatives, on 1 January 1989 from part of the resources of the Wysoki Stoczek Południe estate, a new independent cooperative was created called "Bacieczki" in the area of Swobodna, Szeroka and Łagodna streets.
