= PhotoAid =

Biometric photos company

PhotoAid S.A.

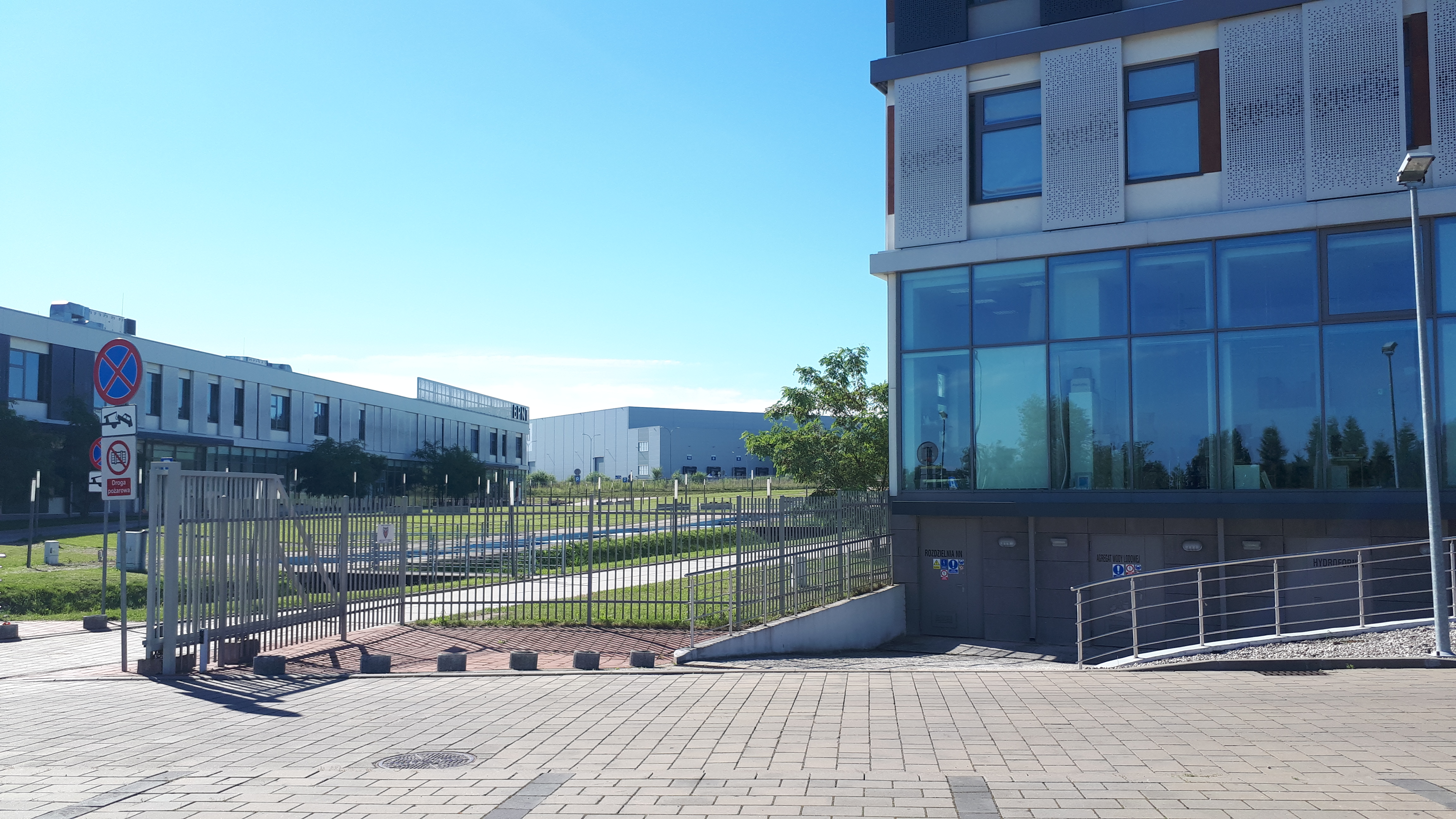
- PhotoAid HQ in the Bialystok Science and Technology Park
- Formerly: FunFotos
- Company type: Joint-stock company
- Industry: Electronic identification; Photo identification; Facial recognition system; Biometrics; Software development; Web development
- Founded: October 2, 2012; 13 years ago
- Founder: Marcin Młodzki; Rafał Młodzki; Tomasz Młodzki
- Headquarters: Bialystok Science and Technology Park, Białystok, Poland
- Area served: Worldwide
- Products: Web applications; Mobile apps; Service as a product; Photo booths
- Brands: PhotoAid; Passport Photo Online
- Services: Digital image processing for biometric passports
- Revenue: ▲US$10M (2023)
- Number of employees: ▲130 (2022)
- Website: photoaid.com

PhotoAid is a Polish software development and biometric passports company, headquartered in Białystok, Poland, founded in 2012. Operating globally, It develops digital image processing and facial recognition applications, and manufactures photo booths. Throughout 2024, daily 2,000 people around the world took photos using 170 booths, and 70,000 people in 150 countries use the mobile app monthly.

From 2023 to 2025, PhotoAid was included three times on the "FT 1000," the Financial Times' list of fastest-growing companies in Europe.

== History ==
=== Photo-booth network ===
Brothers Marcin (b. 1984), Rafał (b. 1982), and Tomasz (b. 1986) Młodzki, students of law, computer science, and philosophy, respectively, were running an educational website for learning foreign languages Fiszkoteka. In 2012, they founded FunFotos, to manufacture photo booths and manage a network of the devices. First FunFotos booths that Młodzkis built in the family garage, had proprietary software and were used only for taking souvenir photos.

In 2015, when the Młodzkis had around 70 photo booths in shopping malls, amusement parks, and cinema multiplexes across Poland, a venture capital fund Inovo Venture Partners invested PLN 1.3 million in the company. In 2016, FunFotos started to build a network of photo booths that enabled taking biometric photos adapted to identity documents: biometric passports, driver's licenses, registration cards, travel visas, as well as the Karta Polaka (The Pole's Card), and other residence permits. The company placed its photo booths in local government offices and passport offices. In 2017, it launched the first stationary photo point under the brand FotoExpress.

In 2018, FunFotos had 130 photo booths for taking biometric passport photos. In 2019, the network had 180 devices across Poland, and a printing point in Boston. The company had PLN 4 million (US$1 million) in revenues. By 2024, daily 2,000 people around the world took photos using 170 booths.

=== Passport-photo apps ===
Since 2019, the company worked on a web service adapted to edit photos taken with smartphones for the use in documents. In late 2019, a demo version of the Android app was released.

In February 2020, the Młodzkis bought back Inovo's shares of the company. In March 2020, due to the COVID-19 pandemic, they decided to focus on developing a photo software-as-a-service ecosystem based on a mobile app, while hibernating the photo booth business for the duration of the pandemic. In 2020, FunFotos employed 18 people.

In cooperation with the Faculty of Mathematics, Informatics and Mechanics of the University of Warsaw, the company developed a set of algorithms allowing recognition of specific features in photographs of people, followed by the automatic verification and correction. With a proprietary photo application for creating photos for ID cards, the company has transformed from an analog to digital business operating online around the world. In August 2020, FunFotos launched mobile apps PhotoAid and Passport Photo Online, allowing users to take biometric photos for official documents with their mobile phone cameras. The software was co-financed by the Polish Agency for Enterprise Development.

In 2021, the company rebranded to PhotoAid, and registered its trademark at the European Union Intellectual Property Office. The app was used in 90 countries. In September 2021, the company received PLN 2 million in another round of investment financing, and transformed into a joint-stock company. In 2022, the company provided services in over 80 countries, while it had over 130 people on board.

In 2023, PhotoAid's revenues amounted to PLN 38.9 million (US$10 million), 26% higher than 2022. Two acquisitions and technological investments resulted with the company's loss of PLN 2.7 million (US$0.7 million), compared to a profit of PLN 3.5 million (US$0.9 million) in 2022. PhotoAid acquired a German online passport photo service Biometrisches-passbild.net, and an American photo service Epassportphoto.com.

In 2024, the company joined as a corporate member of the trade association Professional Photographers of America.

== Software ==
In a selfie uploaded to the PhotoAid mobile app, the artificial-intelligence algorithms detect a face, crop the image, and turn the background into a solid white, transforming the file into a passport photo – adjusting the size and lighting, in accordance with regulatory requirements in over 13 countries. Immediately after uploading the photo, the AI is able to verify and mark it correct or incorrect. The app converts a photo in three seconds. Images processed and scaled to passport and visa photos go through a double-match test: by the software itself, and by an expert.

In 2022, the app was used by over 11.5 million users, for over 10,000 types of documents in over 150 countries. In 2024, 70,000 people used the app each month in 150 countries, mainly Poland, United States, France, United Kingdom, Germany, Spain, and Italy.

== Social involvement ==
In June 2021, under the honorary patronage of the Ministry of Development, Labor and Technology, PhotoAid carried out a campaign “Kreuj obraz zawodowy” (Create Your Professional Image), enabling free use of the professional photo creator for CVs on its platforms. Throughout 2021, PhotoAid carried out social campaigns towards commune offices, seniors, and primary school students, taking ID photos as part of the state digital-document app mObywatel.

In October 2022, in cooperation with provincial governments, the company took 120,000 biometric photos for refugees from Ukraine, as part of the campaign PESEL for Ukraine.

== Awards and accolades ==
PhotoAid was included in the Financial Times' and Statista's "FT 1000" ranking, among the fastest-growing companies in Europe for 2023, 2024, and 2025.

In 2024, the company was included by Deloitte in the "Deloitte Technology Fast 500" for 2023, the list of fastest growing tech companies of the EMEA region. The company's founders received the EY Entrepreneur of the Year Award, in the New Technologies/Innovation, for in the category New Technologies/ Innovations. In late 2024, PhotoAid has won the main prize at the Polish startup ecosystem awards Aulery.
