= Osiedle Jaroszówka, Białystok =

Jaroszówka
- District (osiedle) of Białystok
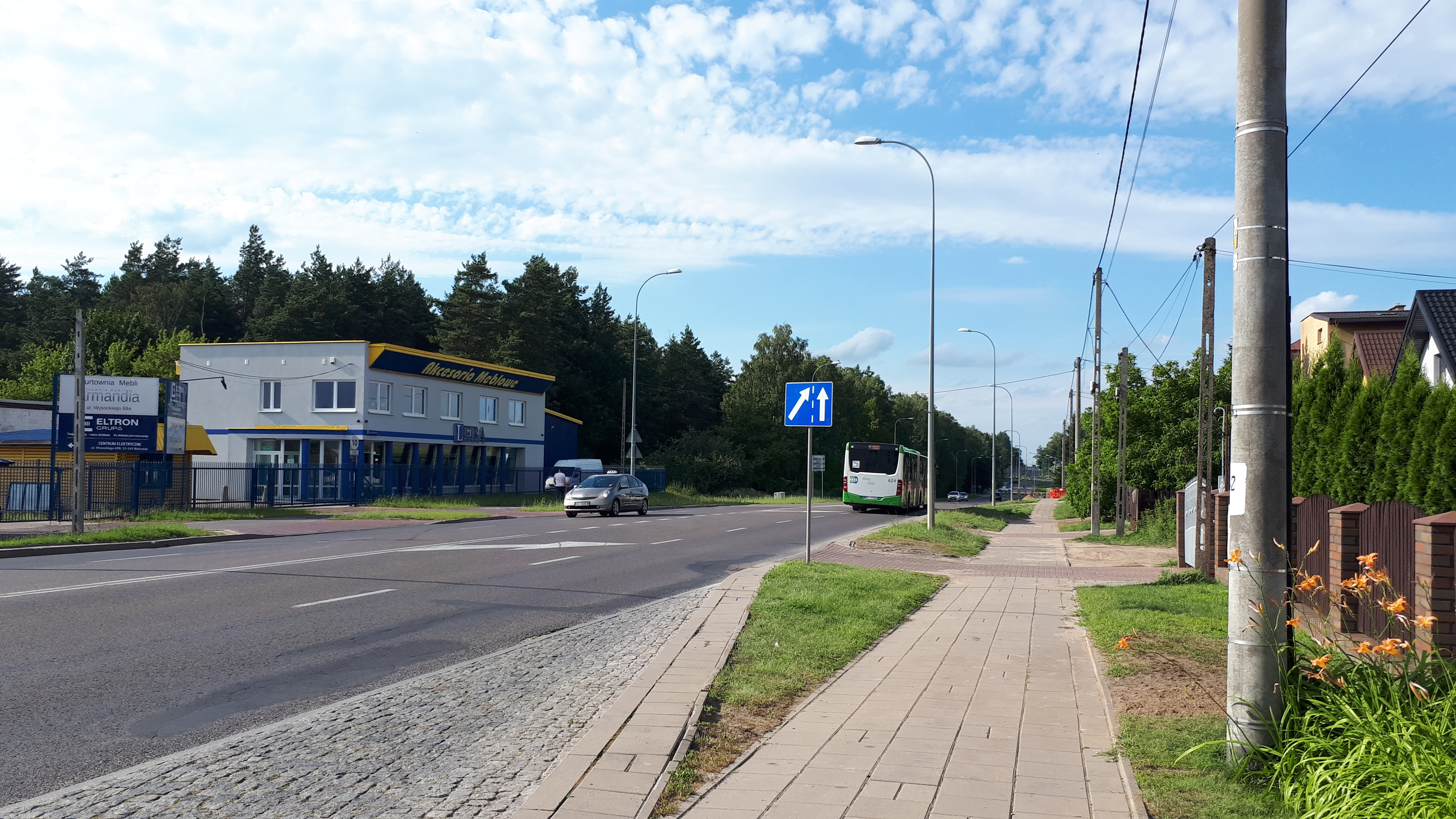
- Wysockiego Street in the district

- Location of Jaroszówka within Białystok
- Coordinates: 53°9′54″N 23°11′36″E
- Country: Poland
- Voivodeship: Podlaskie
- County/City: Białystok

Area
  - Total: 11.72 km^{2} (4.53 sq mi)
- Website: www.bialystok.pl

Jaroszówka is one of the districts of the Polish city of Białystok. It is a suburban dormitory district with low buildings, mainly detached houses.

== History ==
In 1945 in Pietrasze Forest which is located within the district's boundaries, an Internal Security Corps (KWB) firing range was established. At least one death sentence was publicly executed there, Mieczysław Kaźmierski nicknamed "Hurricane", which deserted the KBW and joined the anti government guerrilla unit of Capt. Romuald Rajs "Bury". Kaźmierski was tied to a tree, and fifteen random soldiers, colleagues of the convict, were selected for the firing squad. None of the soldiers fired a lethal shot. Shots from handguns were shot by the commanding chief of the regiment's staff of execution. It is highly probable that the corpse of the executed was buried on the spot. An unconfirmed account also shows that the body of Capt. Władysław Łukasiuk "Młot" and another soldier of the anti-communist underground, unknown by name. Nowadays the area is publicly available and the remains of the shooting range are visible.
