= Bobrowniki, Białystok County =

Bobrowniki
- Village
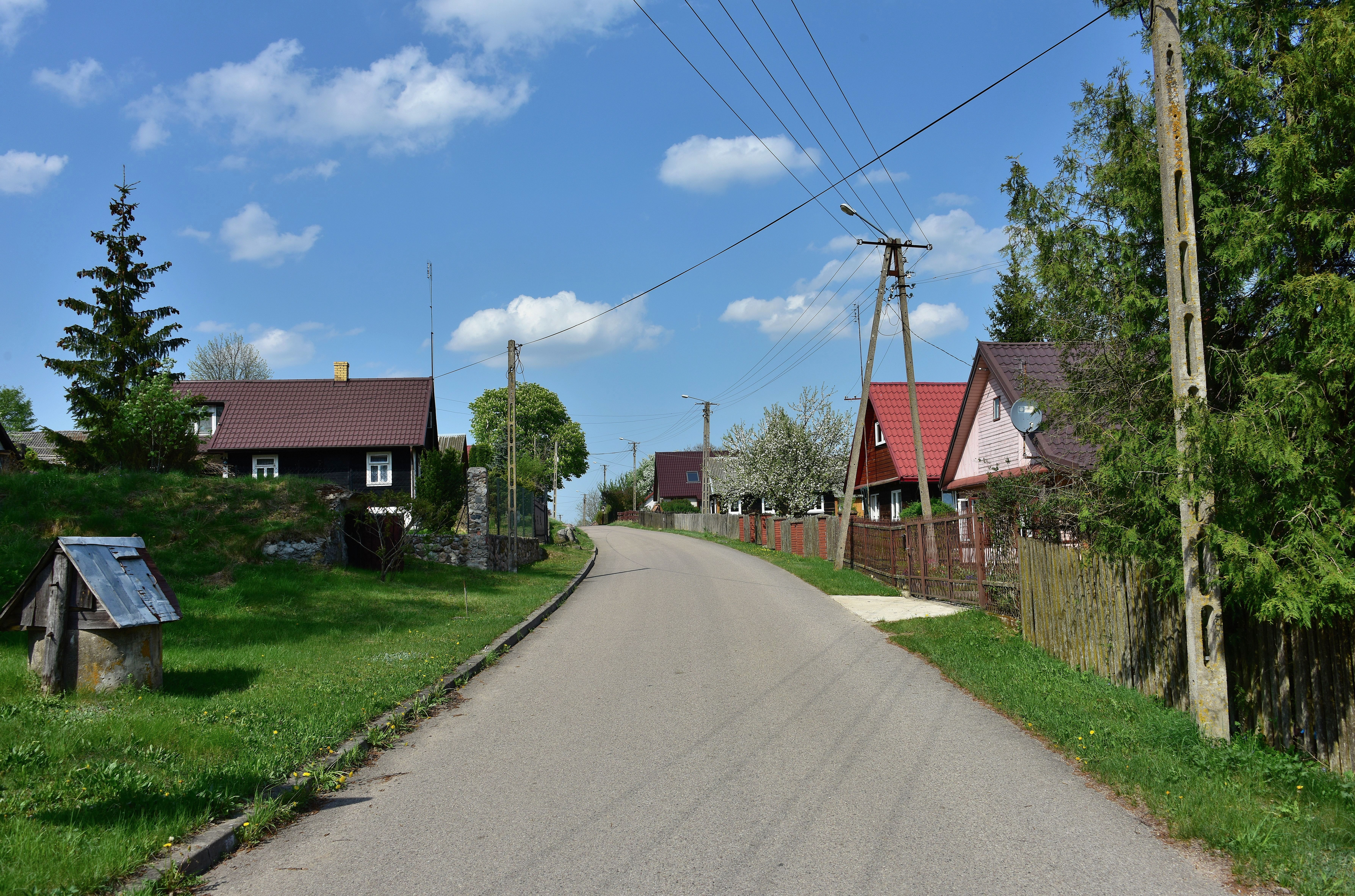

- Location within Poland
- Coordinates: 53°8′N 23°53′E
- Country: Poland
- Voivodeship: Podlaskie
- County: Białystok
- Gmina: Gródek
- Population: 141

Bobrowniki [bɔbrɔvˈniki] is a village in the administrative district of Gmina Gródek, within Białystok County, Podlaskie Voivodeship, in north-eastern Poland, close to the border with Belarus.
