= Osiedle =

Polish term for city subdivisions

Osiedle (Polish pronunciation: [ɔˈɕɛdlɛ]; plural: osiedla) is a term used in Poland to denote a designated subdivision or neighbourhood of a city or its dzielnica, or of a town, with its own council and executive. Like the dzielnica and sołectwo, an osiedle is an auxiliary unit (jednostka pomocnicza) of a gmina. These units are created by decision of the gmina council, and do not have legal personality in their own right. In the case of an urban-rural gmina, it is also possible for a whole town to be designated an auxiliary unit.

Not all Polish cities or towns have osiedla in the above sense. However the word osiedle is also frequently used to denote any housing estate or development.
