= Gmina Choroszcz =

Gmina Choroszcz Choroszcz Commune
- Gmina
- Flag Coat of arms

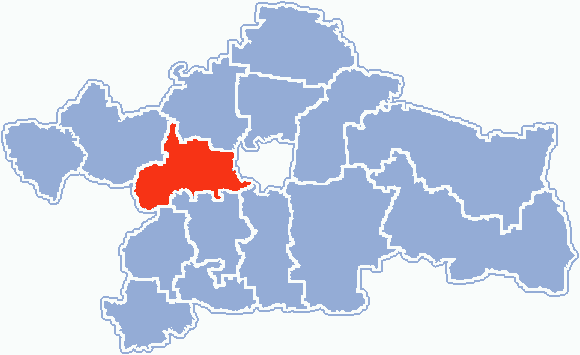
- Location within Białystok County
- Coordinates (Choroszcz): 53°8′N 22°59′E
- Country: Poland
- Voivodeship: Podlaskie
- County: Białystok County
- Seat: Choroszcz

Area
  - Total: 163.5 km^{2} (63.1 sq mi)

Population (2011)
  - Total: 14,127 ▲
  - Density: 86.40/km^{2} (223.8/sq mi)
  - Urban: 5,732
  - Rural: 8,395
- Time zone: UTC+1 (CET)
  - Summer (DST): UTC+2 (CEST)
- Website: http://www.choroszcz.pl

Gmina Choroszcz is an urban-rural gmina (administrative district) in Białystok County, Podlaskie Voivodeship, in north-eastern Poland. Its seat is the town of Choroszcz, which lies approximately 13 kilometres (8 mi) west of the regional capital Białystok.

The gmina covers an area of 163.5 square kilometres (63.1 sq mi), and as of 2011 its total population is 14,127 (out of which the population of Choroszcz amounts to 5,732, and the population of the rural part of the gmina is 8,395).

== History ==
=== Russian Empire (1861-1915) ===
Gmina Choroszcz (rus. Хорощанская волость) with the seat in Barszczewo was created in 1861 as the result of administrative reform in Russian Empire. This time gmina was a part of Belostoksky Uyezd in Grodno Governorate.

In 1890 in Gmina Choroszcz there were 50 villages and 5792 inhabitants.

Red and purple stripes - Area of Gmina Choroszcz since 1973Blue and purple stripes - Area of Gmina Choroszcz/Gmina Barszczewo in 1861-1954

=== World War I (1915-1919) ===
During years 1915-1919 Gmina Choroszcz belonged to occupied by German Empire Ober Ost (1915-1918) and Lithuania (1918). In August 1919 this terrain was taken by Polish administration.

=== Second Polish Republic (1919-1939) ===
During this time gmina Choroszcz was part of Białystok County in Białystok Voivodship. According to 1921 Polish census, to gmina belonged villages: Baciuty, Barszczewo, Barszczówka, Czaplin, Dzikie, Gajowniki, Izbiszcze, Konowały, Kościuki, Kruszewo, Mińce, Niecki, Nieroniki, Niewodnica Korycka, Ogrodniki, Oliszki, Pańki, Rogów, Sienkiewicze, Tołcze, Topilec, Trypude, Zaczerlany, Zalesiany, Zawady and Żółtki, folwarks: Markowszczyzna, Zalesiany, industrial settlement: Topole, colonies: Caplin, Dzikie, Kościuki, Niewodnica Kościelna, Sienkiewicze, Topilec and train station Niewodnica. In this time in gmina lived 5590 people: 4578 Roman Catholic, 1001 Orthodox, 3 Evangelic, 3 Greek Catholic and 5 Mosaic. Also 5129 inhabitants declared Polish nationality, 451 Belarusian, 7 Russian, 2 Rusyn and 1 Estonian. In gmina there was 899 residential buildings.

In 1933 in gmina Choroszcz has been created 28 gromadas:

- Baciuty (Baciuty)
- Barszczówka (Barszczówka)
- Barszczewo (Barszczewo)
- Czaplino (Czaplino, Czaplino Kolonia)
- Dzikie (Dzikie, Dzikie Kolonia)
- Gajowniki (Gajowniki)
- Izbiszcze (Izbiszcze)
- Jeroniki (Jeroniki)
- Kruszewo (Kruszewo)
- Konowały (Konowały)
- Kościuki (Kościuki)
- Mińce (Mińce)
- Niewodnica Korycka (Niewodnica Korycka, Topole)
- Niewodnica Kościelna (Niewodnica Kościelna)
- Niecki (Niecki)
- Oliszki (Oliszki)
- Ogrodniki (Ogrodniki)
- Pańki (Pańki)
- Rogowo (Rogowo)
- Sienkiewicze (Sienkiewicze)
- Tołcze (Tołcze, Markowszczyzna, Markowszczyzna Cegielnia)
- Trypucie (Trypucie, Borki kol, Budki kolejowe)
- Topilec Wieś (Topilec Wieś)
- Topilec Kolonia (Topilec Kolonia)
- Zawady (Zawady)
- Zaczerlany (Zaczerlany)
- Zalesiany (Zalesiany, Zalesiany Folwark)
- Żółtki (Żółtki)

=== Gmina Barszczewo (1944-1954) ===
In 1944, gmina Choroszcz was renamed to Gmina Barszczewo.

In 1951 there were created 4 new gromadas: Baciuty Kolonia (from gromada Baciuty), Markowszczyzna (from gromada Tołcze), Rogowo Kolonia (from gromada Rogowo) and Śliwno (from gromada Kruszewo).

The gmina was dissolved in 1954, due to administrative reform creating bigger gromadas in place of gminas. Former smaller gromadas in gmina Barszczewo became part of:

- gromada Barszczewo (gromadas: Barszczewo, Czaplino, Ogrodniki, Oliszki, Sienkiewicze and part of Zaczerlany and Gajowniki)
- gromada Fasty (gromadas: Jeroniki, Dzikie, Żółtki)
- gromada Konowały (gromadas: Izbiszcze, Konowały, Kruszewo, Pańki, Śliwno)
- gromada Rogowo (gromadas: Kościuki, Rogowo, Rogowo-Kolonia)
- gromada Trypucie (gromadas: Barszczówka, Markowszczyzna, Mińce, Niecki, Niewodnica Korycka, Niewodnica Kościelna, Tołcze, Trypucie, Zalesiany)
- gromada Zawady (gromadas: Baciuty, Baciuty Kolonia, Topilec, Topilec Kolonia, Zawady and part of Zaczerlany and Gajowniki)

=== Since 1973 ===
Gmina Choroszcz was recreated in 1973 in current borders.

== Transport ==
Through a gmina crosses 2 expressways: S8 (opened in 2012) and S19 (opened in 2026).

== Public transport ==
According to map of transport exclusion of Krajopis, in 2024 in gmina Choroszcz people living in 38,5% buildings in gmina didn't have access to public transport. In gmina are running buses of PKS Nova and urban transport of Białystok (lines 103, 107, 113 and 123).

== Demography ==
In 2021 in gmina lived 15 985 people.

== Villages ==
Apart from the town of Choroszcz, Gmina Choroszcz contains the villages and settlements of Babino, Barszczewo, Czaplino, Dzikie, Dzikie-Kolonia, Gajowniki, Gajowniki-Kolonia, Izbiszcze, Jeroniki, Klepacze, Kolonia Czaplino, Konowały, Kościuki, Krupniki, Kruszewo, Łyski, Mińce, Ogrodniki Barszczewskie, Oliszki, Pańki, Porosły, Porosły-Kolonia, Rogówek, Rogowo, Rogowo-Kolonia, Rogowo-Majątek, Ruszczany, Sienkiewicze, Sikorszczyzna, Śliwno, Turczyn, Zaczerlany, Zaczerlany-Kolonia, Złotoria, Złotoria-Kolonia, Złotoria-Podlesie, Żółtki and Żółtki-Kolonia.

== Neighbouring gminas ==
Gmina Choroszcz is bordered by the city of Białystok and by the gminas of Dobrzyniewo Duże, Juchnowiec Kościelny, Kobylin-Borzymy, Łapy, Sokoły, Turośń Kościelna and Tykocin.
