= Mince =

Mince may refer to:

== Food ==
- Mincing, a food preparation technique
- Ground meat, also known as mince
  - Ground beef
  - Mince and tatties, a Scottish dish
- Mincemeat, a mixture of chopped dried fruit, distilled spirits, spices and, historically, meat

== People ==
- Mince Fratelli, a member of Scottish rock band The Fratellis
- Johnny Mince (1912–1997), American swing jazz clarinetist
- Tadas Mincė (born 1993), also known as Mincė, Lithuanian basketball player

== Other uses ==
- Mińce, a village in north-eastern Poland
- MINCE, an early text editor for CP/M microcomputers

== See also ==
- Mince pie, made from mincemeat, traditionally served during the Christmas season
- Minced oath, a more polite expression based on a profanity
- Mincing Lane, a street in the City of London
