= Barszczewo =

Barszczewo refers to the following places in Poland:

- Barszczewo, Gmina Choroszcz
- Barszczewo, Gmina Michałowo
