= Voivodeship road 678 =

Road in Poland

Voivodeship Road 678
- Droga wojewódzka nr 678
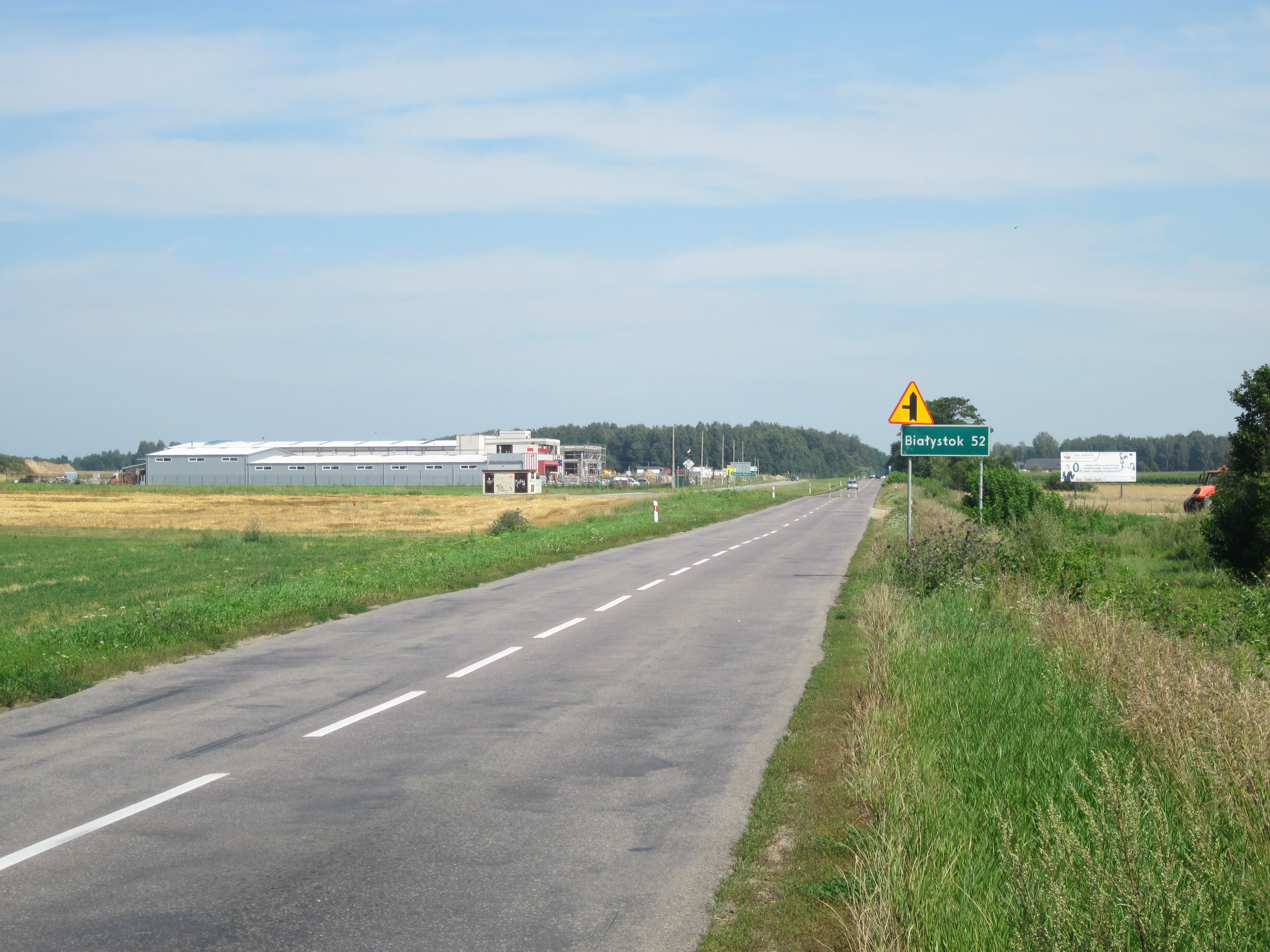

Route information
- Maintained by Podlaski Zarząd Dróg Wojewódzkich
- Length: 52 km (32 mi)

Major junctions
- From: Białystok
- To: Wysokie Mazowieckie

Location
- Country: Poland
- Regions: Podlaskie Voivodeship
- Major cities: Tołcze, Roszki-Wodźki, Białystok

Highway system
- National roads in Poland; Voivodeship roads
← DW 677	→ DW 679

Voivodeship road 678 (Polish: droga wojewódzka nr 678) in Poland is a voivodeship road with a length of 52 km located entirely in the Podlaskie Voivodeship.

== Route ==
It is a route connects the Voivodeship administrative center Białystok with Wysokie Mazowieckie. It runs through the Wysokie Mazowieckie County (gminas: Wysokie Mazowieckie, Wysokie Mazowieckie commune, Sokoły commune) and Białystok county (communes: Łapy commune, Turośń Kościelna commune, Juchnowiec Kościelny commune, Białystok County, Białystok city).

There are 2 rail crossings on the route (in Kruszewo-Brodów and in Baciuty), several bridges over the rivers Ślina, Narew and Awissa. The route has 5 intersections with provincial and national roads.

It is planned to change the course of the route to run through Łapy and from there along with DW681 to Białystok, in order to bring out heavy traffic from the Narew National Park, Łupianki Stara and Tołcz and improve transport from Wysokie Mazowieckie To Łapy and Białystok. The construction of the Łapy beltway and the dual carriageway route of Łapy–Białystok is underway, and the belfry of Księżyna and a two-section section through Horodniany and Kleosin to the capital of the province was established.
