= Markowszczyzna =

- Village
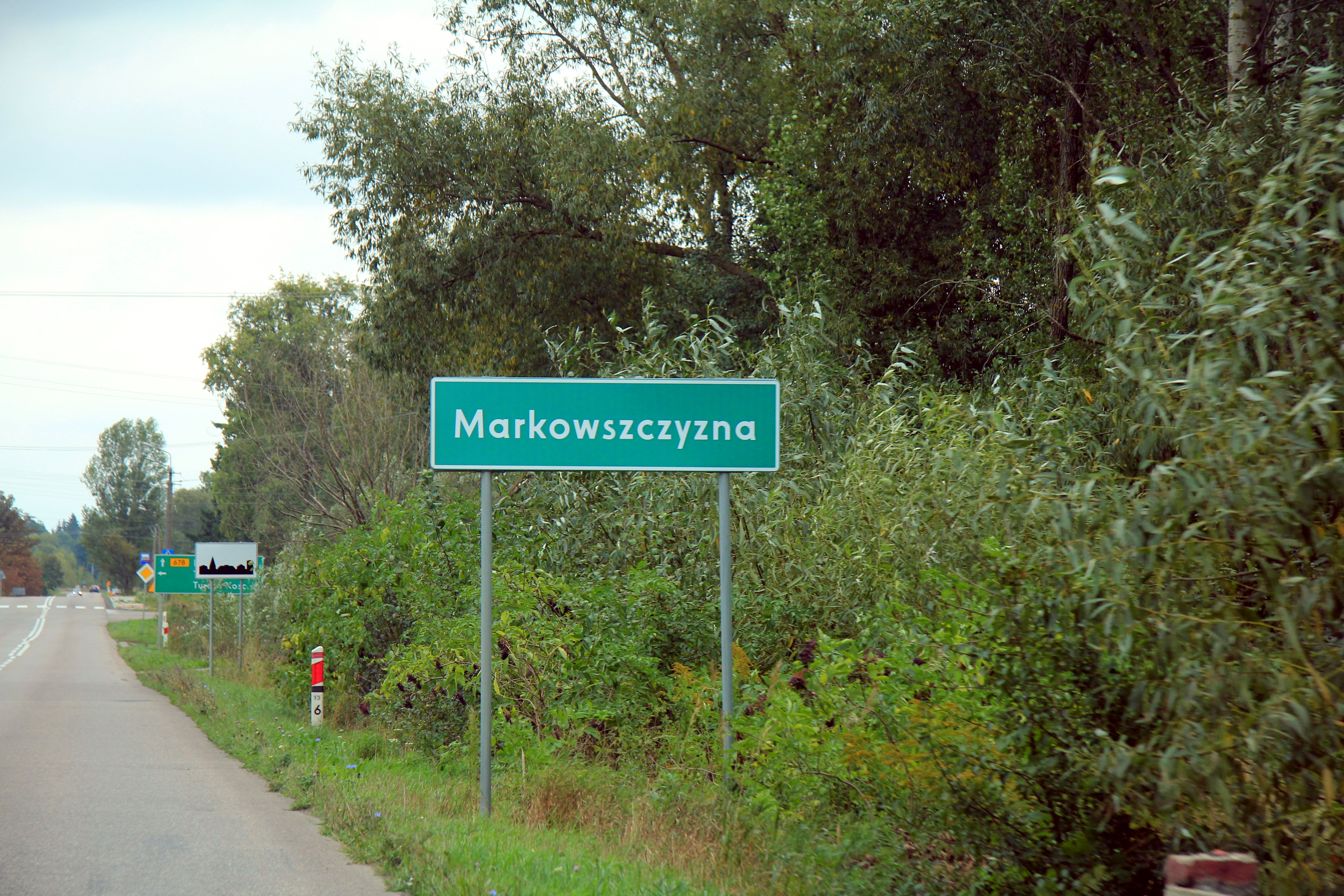

- Location within Poland
- Coordinates: 53°01′53″N 23°05′02″E
- Country: Poland
- Voivodeship: Podlaskie
- County: Białystok
- Gmina: Turośń Kościelna

Population
  - Total: 140
- Time zone: UTC+1 (CET)
  - Summer (DST): UTC+2 (CEST)
- Postal code: 18-106
- Vehicle registration: BIA

Markowszczyzna [markɔfʂˈt͡ʂɨzna] is a village in the administrative district of Gmina Turośń Kościelna, within Białystok County, Podlaskie Voivodeship, in north-eastern Poland.

== History ==
The village was formerly a possession of the Łyszczyński noble family. From 1826 there was a cloth factory, moved in 1856 to Topole. Markowszczyzna and Topole were connected by a road built by just two people, including one of the heirs, Michał Łyszczyński.

In the interwar period, it was administratively located in Gmina Choroszcz in the Białystok County in the Białystok Voivodeship of Poland. According to the 1921 census, Markowszczyzna had a population of 93, entirely Polish by nationality and Roman Catholic by confession.

Following the German-Soviet invasion of Poland, which started World War II in September 1939, the village was occupied by the Soviet Union until 1941, and then by Nazi Germany until 1944. The German administration operated a forced labour camp for Jews in the village.
