= Rogowo, Białystok County =

Rogowo
- Village
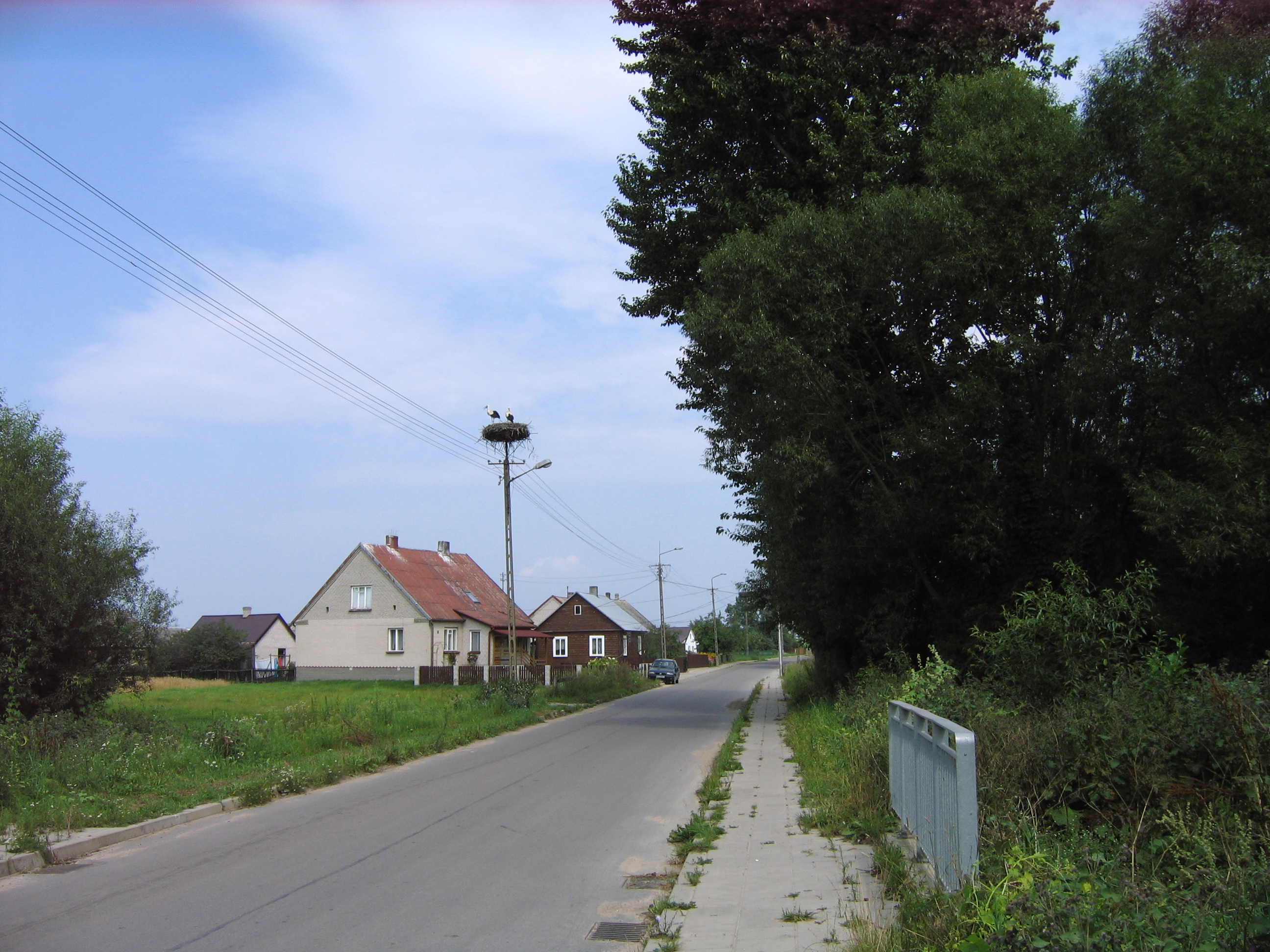

- Location within Poland
- Coordinates: 53°8′4″N 22°53′55″E
- Country: Poland
- Voivodeship: Podlaskie
- County: Białystok
- Gmina: Choroszcz
- Population: 223

Rogowo [rɔˈɡɔvɔ] is a village in the administrative district of Gmina Choroszcz, within Białystok County, Podlaskie Voivodeship, in north-eastern Poland.
