= Babino, Podlaskie Voivodeship =

Babino
- Village
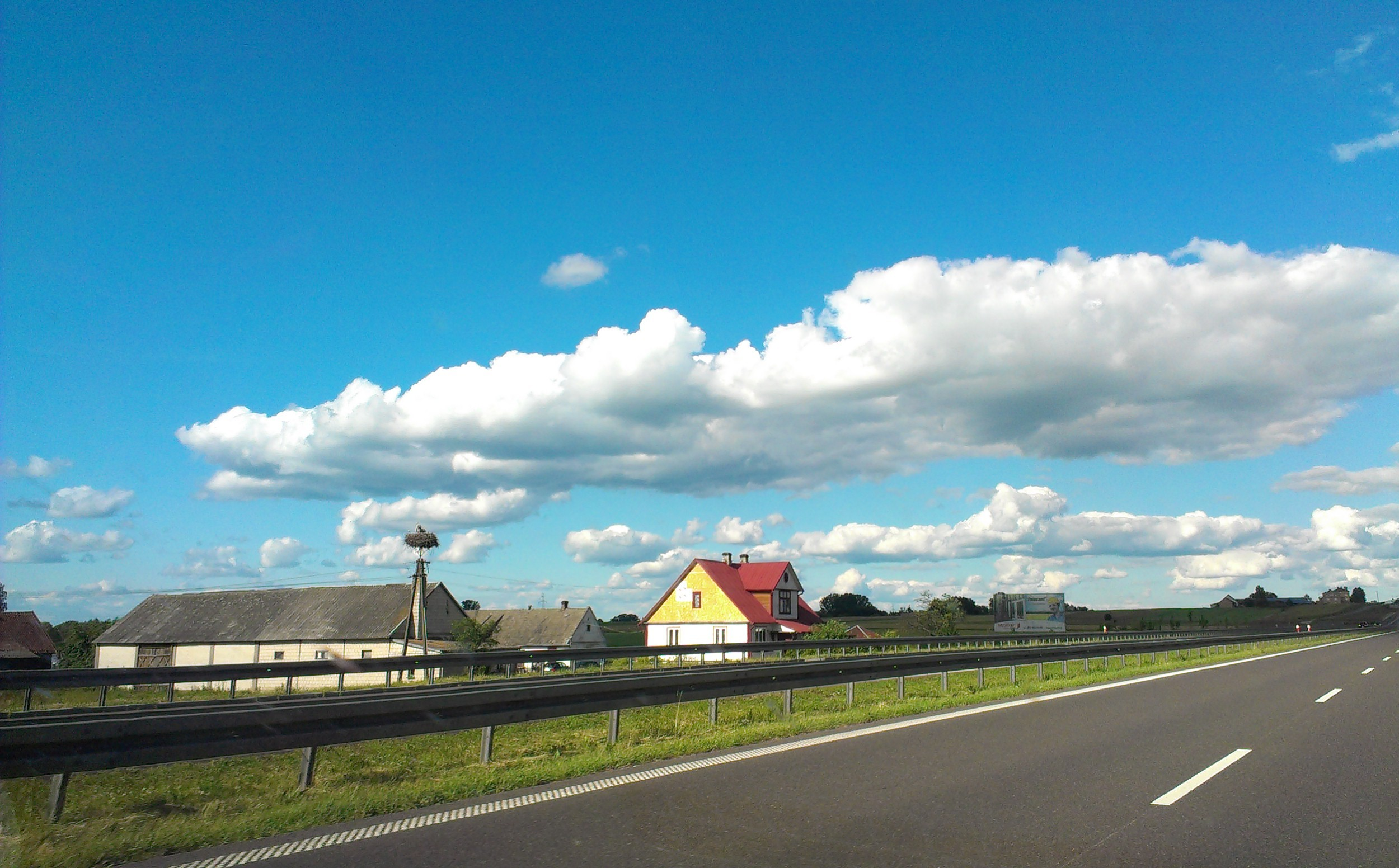

- Location within Poland
- Coordinates: 53°10′N 22°55′E
- Country: Poland
- Voivodeship: Podlaskie
- County: Białystok
- Gmina: Choroszcz

Babino [baˈbinɔ] is a village in the administrative district of Gmina Choroszcz, within Białystok County, Podlaskie Voivodeship, in north-eastern Poland.

On 22 March 1952, in the village, near the Warsaw-Białystok road, the National Military Union (NZW) patrol commanded by Stanisław Franciszek Grabowski ("Wiarus") was ambushed and killed. Stanisław Grabowski was one of the longest fighting soldiers of the anti-communist underground in post-war Poland. During the tearing up of the raid, Grabowski and two other partisans died with weapons in hand.

== Transport ==
Roads in Babino:

- E67 Helsinki – Kaunas – Warsaw – Praga,
- DK 8 Kudowa-Zdrój - Wrocław - Warsaw - Białystok - Suwałki - Budzisko,
