= Sikorszczyzna =

- Village
- Location within Poland
- Coordinates: 53°08′55″N 23°02′05″E
- Country: Poland
- Voivodeship: Podlaskie
- County: Białystok
- Gmina: Choroszcz

Sikorszczyzna [ɕikɔrʂˈt͡ʂɨzna] is a village in the administrative district of Gmina Choroszcz, within Białystok County, Podlaskie Voivodeship, in north-eastern Poland.
