= Zaczerlany =

- Village
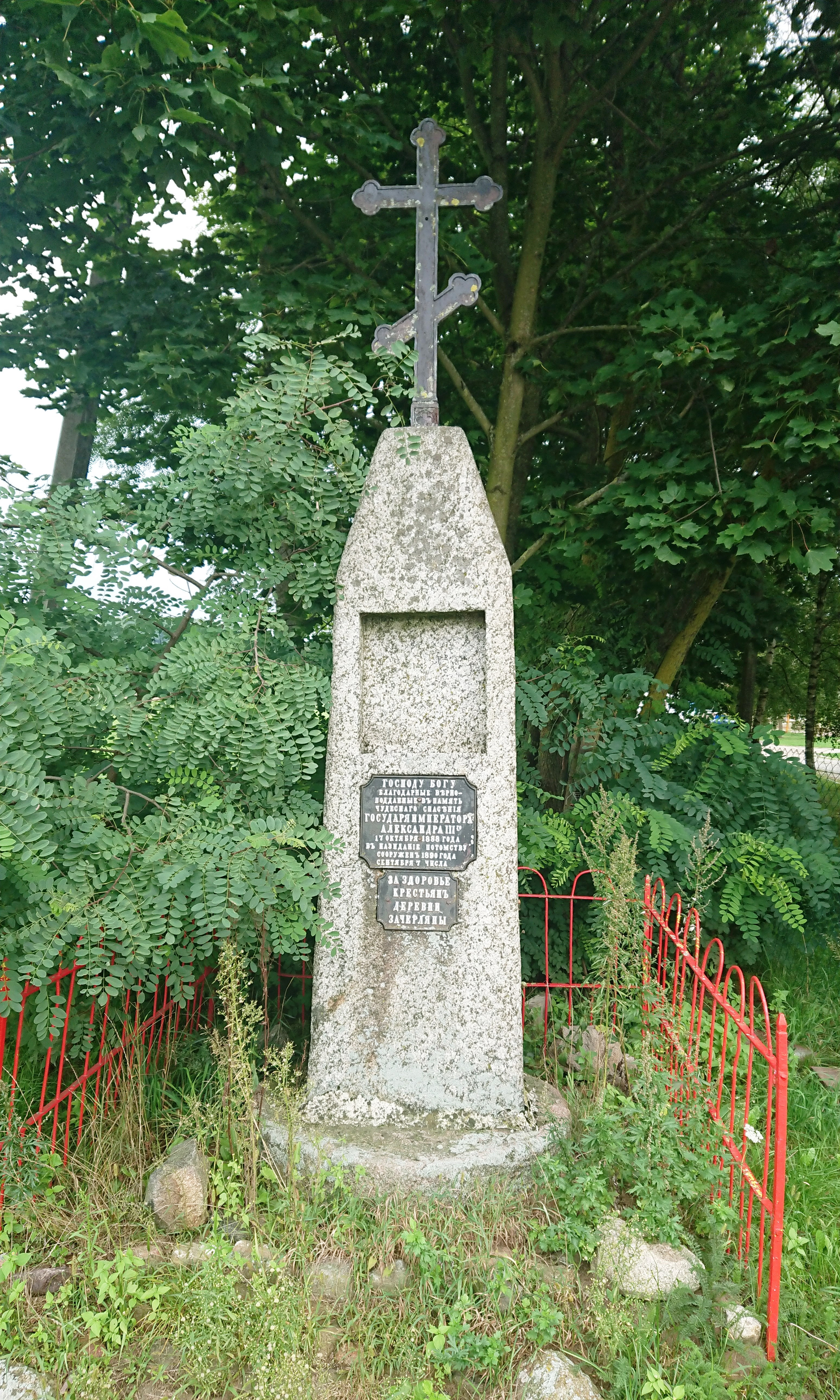
- A commemorative obelisks erected after the railway disaster in Borki, in which the Tsar's train was destroyed. The family of Tsar Alexander III Romanov escaped the accident unharmed.

- Location within Poland
- Coordinates: 53°6′N 22°59′E
- Country: Poland
- Voivodeship: Podlaskie
- County: Białystok
- Gmina: Choroszcz

Zaczerlany [zat͡ʂɛrˈlanɨ] is a village in the administrative district of Gmina Choroszcz, within Białystok County, Podlaskie Voivodeship, in north-eastern Poland.

The monument in the village is a granite obelisk topped with a cast iron orthodox cross. There was an unknown icon on the monument. Below the icon, there are two commemorative plaques with Cyrillic inscriptions. This is the last known remaining monument in modern Poland that is related to the Tsar as after Poland gained independence all monuments of the Romanov family themselves were destroyed along with many others.

The top inscription written in Russian reads as follows, “ GRATEFUL TO THE LORD GOD, THE FAITHFUL SERVED IN MEMORY OF THE MIRACULOUS SALVATION OF THE GOVERNMENT EMPEROR ALEXANDER III ON OCTOBER 17, 1888, FOR THE EDIFICATION OF POSTERITY, CONSTRUCTED ON SEPTEMBER 7, 1890. ”

“ The bottom inscription written in Russian reads as follows, “ FOR THE HEALTH OF THE PEASANTS OF THE VILLAGES ZACZERLANY ”
