= Kolonia Czaplino =

- Settlement
- Location within Poland
- Coordinates: 53°06′52″N 23°01′53″E
- Country: Poland
- Voivodeship: Podlaskie
- County: Białystok
- Gmina: Choroszcz

Kolonia Czaplino [kɔˈlɔɲa t͡ʂaˈplinɔ] is a settlement in the administrative district of Gmina Choroszcz, within Białystok County, Podlaskie Voivodeship, in north-eastern Poland.
