= Dzikie-Kolonia =

- Village
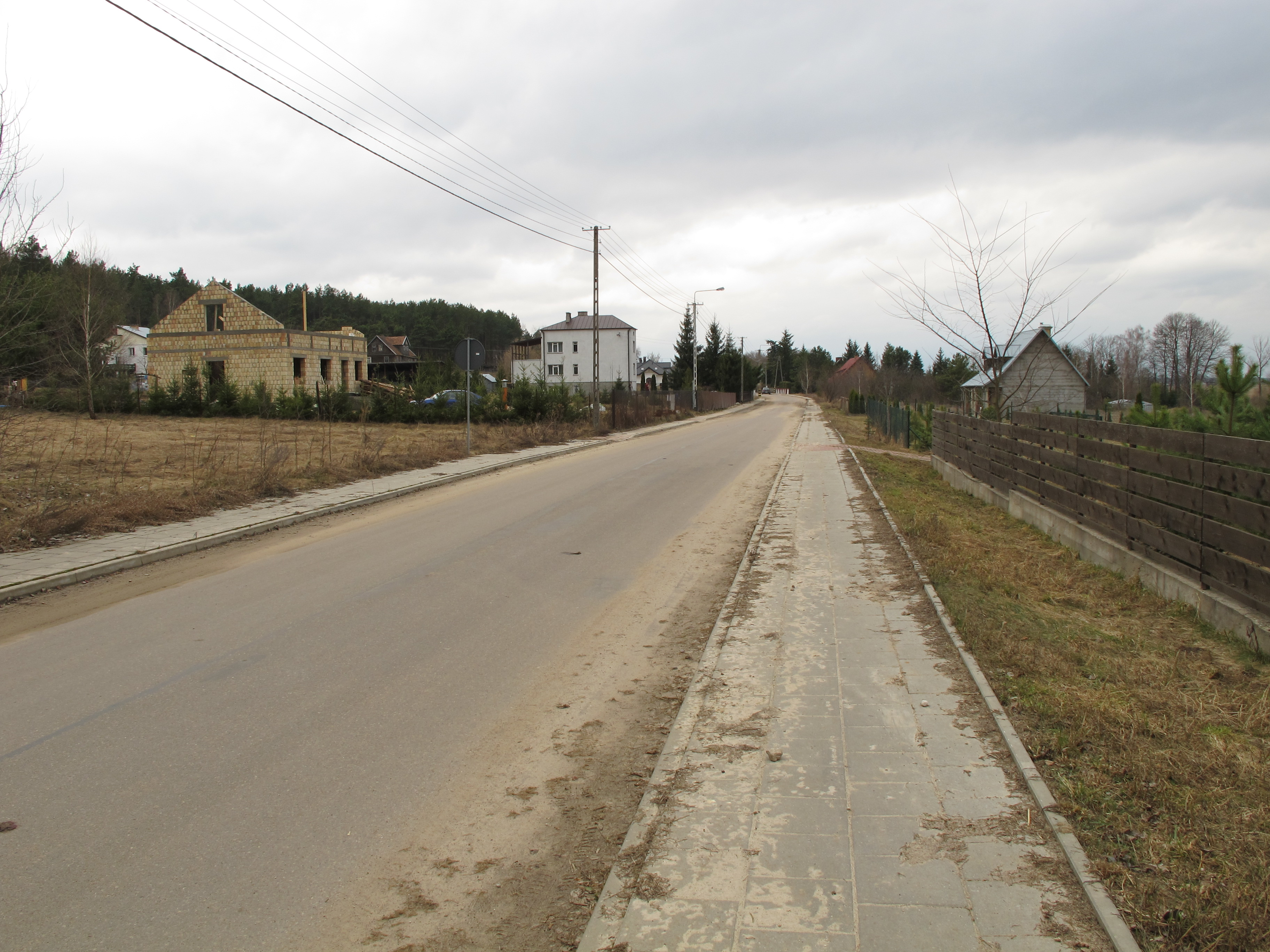

- Location within Poland
- Coordinates: 53°10′44″N 22°59′9″E
- Country: Poland
- Voivodeship: Podlaskie
- County: Białystok
- Gmina: Choroszcz

Dzikie-Kolonia [ˈd͡ʑikʲɛ kɔˈlɔɲa] is a village in the administrative district of Gmina Choroszcz, within Białystok County, Podlaskie Voivodeship, in north-eastern Poland.
