= Porosły =

- Village
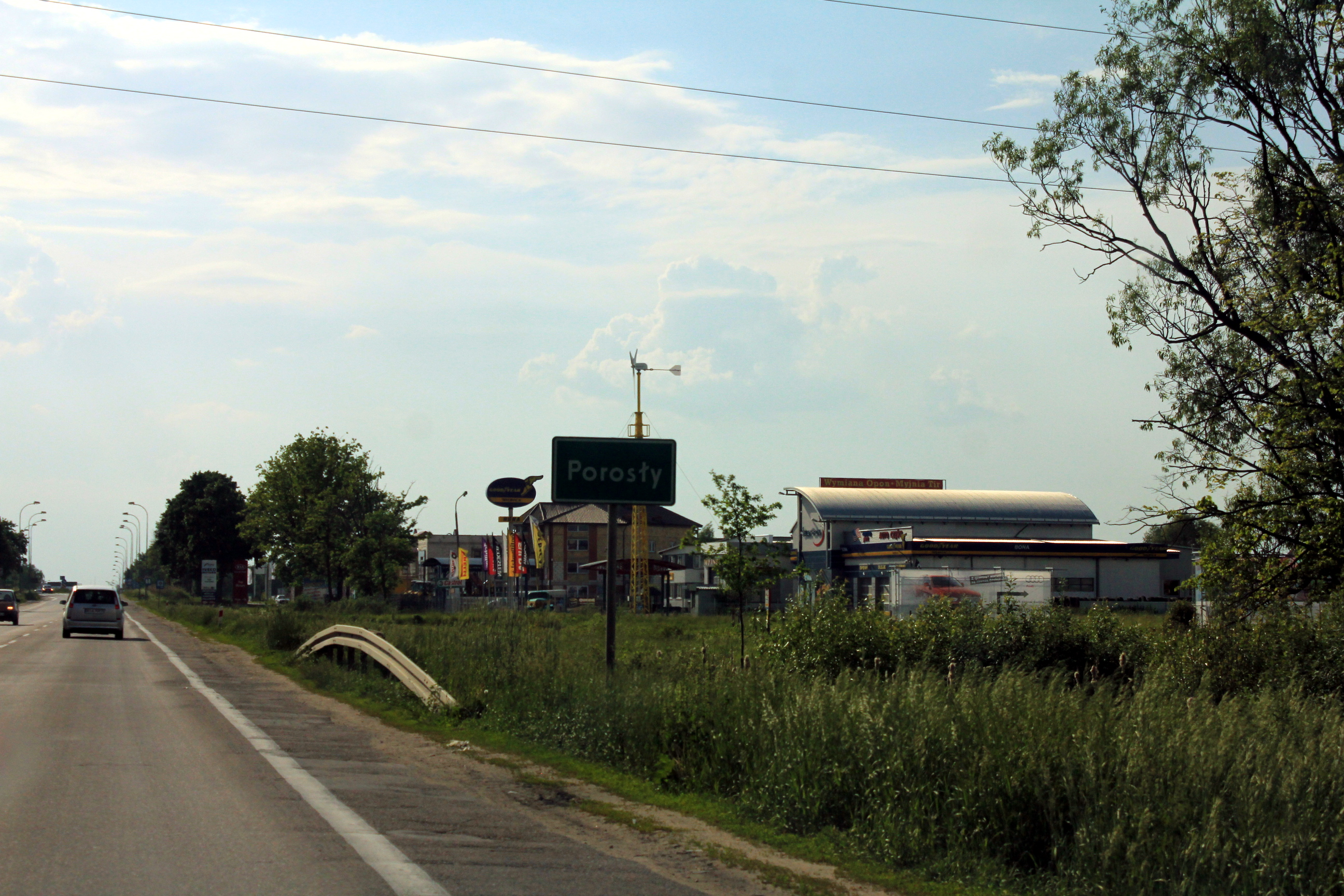

- Location within Poland
- Coordinates: 53°10′N 23°4′E
- Country: Poland
- Voivodeship: Podlaskie
- County: Białystok
- Gmina: Choroszcz
- Population: 350

Porosły [pɔˈrɔswɨ] is a village in the administrative district of Gmina Choroszcz, within Białystok County, Podlaskie Voivodeship, in north-eastern Poland.

== Transport ==
Roads in Porosły:

- E67 Helsinki – Kaunas – Warsaw – Praga,
- DK 8 Kudowa-Zdrój - Wrocław - Warsaw - Białystok - Suwałki - Budzisko,
