= Turczyn, Gmina Choroszcz =

Turczyn
- Village
- Location within Poland
- Coordinates: 53°5′54.44″N 23°5′14.73″E
- Country: Poland
- Voivodeship: Podlaskie
- County: Białystok
- Gmina: Choroszcz

Turczyn [ˈturt͡ʂɨn] is a village in the administrative district of Gmina Choroszcz, within Białystok County, Podlaskie Voivodeship, in north-eastern Poland.
