= Jeroniki =

- Village
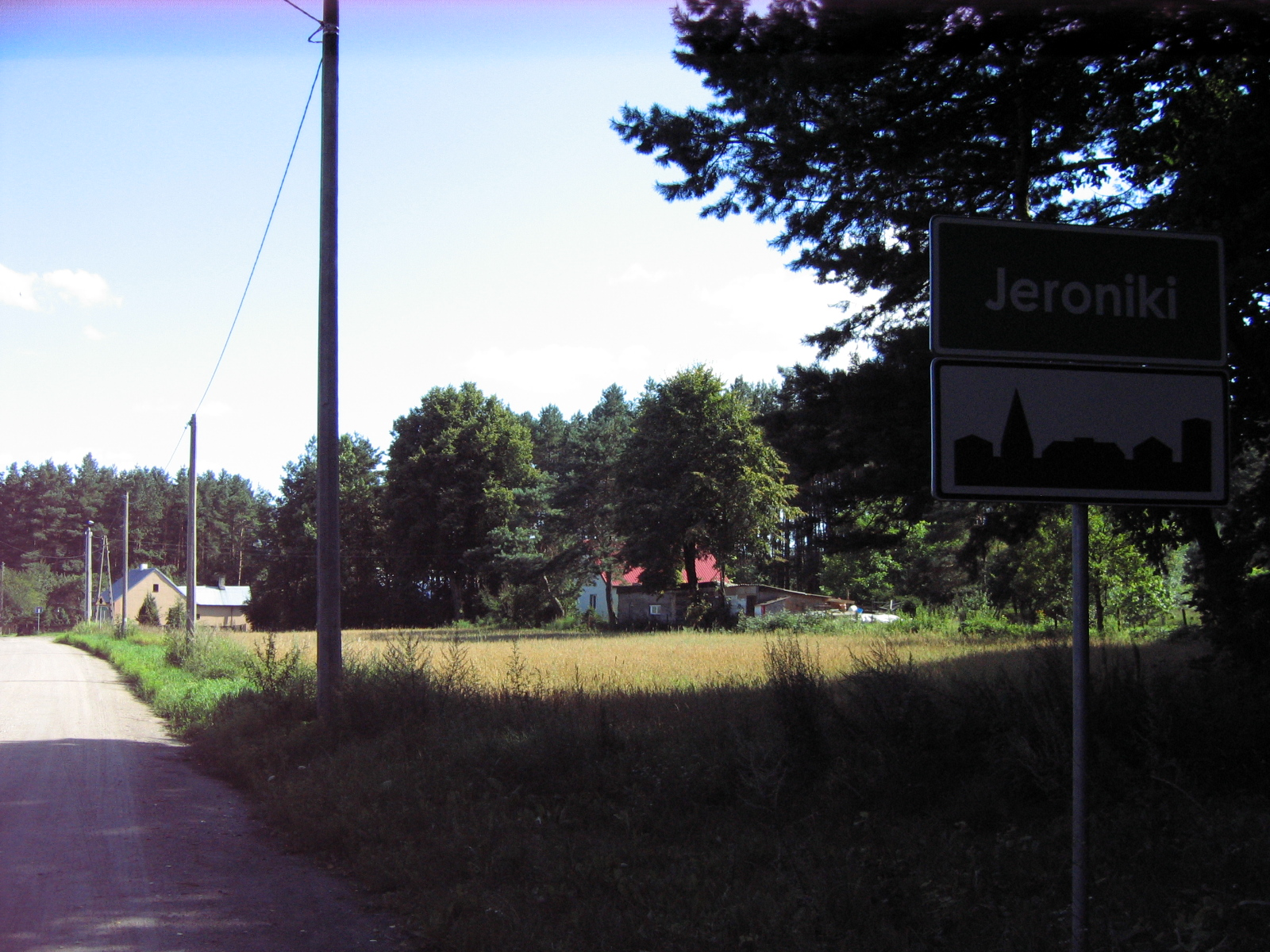

- Location within Poland
- Coordinates: 53°8′53″N 23°1′42″E
- Country: Poland
- Voivodeship: Podlaskie
- County: Białystok
- Gmina: Choroszcz

Jeroniki [jɛrɔˈniki] is a village in the administrative district of Gmina Choroszcz, within Białystok County, Podlaskie Voivodeship, in north-eastern Poland.

The village is considered part of Metropolitan Białystok in order to help economically develop the region.

== Transport ==
Roads in Jeroniki:

- E67 Helsinki – Kaunas – Warsaw – Praga,
- DK 8 Kudowa-Zdrój - Wrocław - Warsaw - Białystok - Suwałki - Budzisko,
