= Rogowo-Kolonia =

- Village
- Location within Poland
- Coordinates: 53°08′54″N 22°53′05″E
- Country: Poland
- Voivodeship: Podlaskie
- County: Białystok
- Gmina: Choroszcz

Rogowo-Kolonia [rɔˈɡɔvɔ kɔˈlɔɲa] is a village in the administrative district of Gmina Choroszcz, within Białystok County, Podlaskie Voivodeship, in north-eastern Poland.
