= Zaczerlany-Kolonia =

- Settlement
- Location within Poland
- Coordinates: 53°06′42″N 22°58′31″E
- Country: Poland
- Voivodeship: Podlaskie
- County: Białystok
- Gmina: Choroszcz

Zaczerlany-Kolonia [zat͡ʂɛrˈlanɨ kɔˈlɔɲa] is a settlement in the administrative district of Gmina Choroszcz, within Białystok County, Podlaskie Voivodeship, in north-eastern Poland.
