= Łyski =

- Village
- Location within Poland
- Coordinates: 53°9′19″N 23°2′52″E
- Country: Poland
- Voivodeship: Podlaskie
- County: Białystok
- Gmina: Choroszcz
- Population: 334

Łyski [ˈwɨski] is a village in the administrative district of Gmina Choroszcz, within Białystok County, Podlaskie Voivodeship, in north-eastern Poland.

== Transport ==
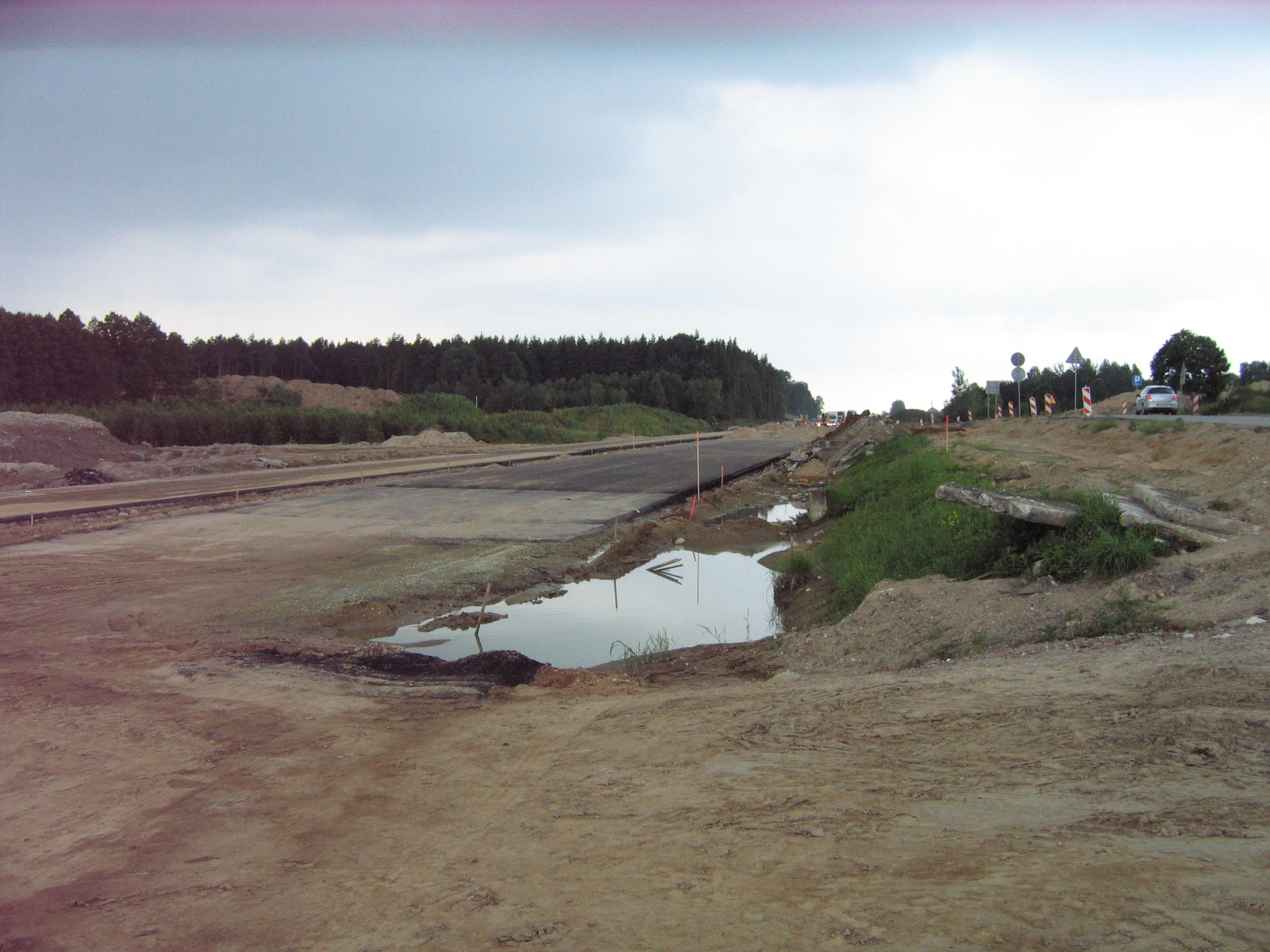
Construction of the expressway in the village of Łyski near Bialystok

Roads in Łyski:

- E67 Helsinki – Kaunas – Warsaw – Praga,
- DK 8 Kudowa-Zdrój - Wrocław - Warsaw - Białystok - Suwałki - Budzisko,
