= Żółtki-Kolonia =

- Settlement
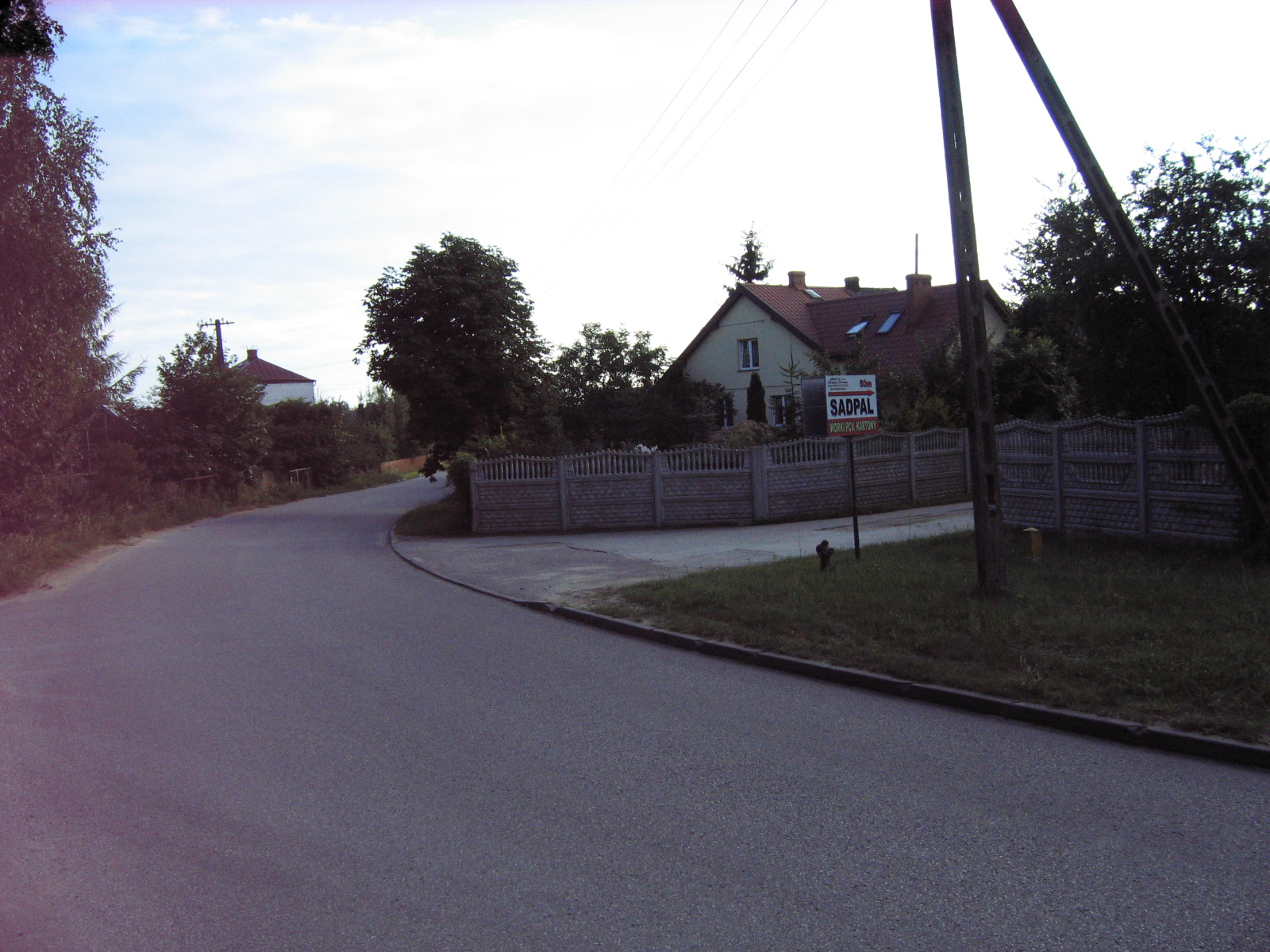

- Location within Poland
- Coordinates: 53°09′51″N 22°59′44″E
- Country: Poland
- Voivodeship: Podlaskie
- County: Białystok
- Gmina: Choroszcz

Żółtki-Kolonia [ˈʐuu̯tki kɔˈlɔɲa] is a settlement in the administrative district of Gmina Choroszcz, within Białystok County, Podlaskie Voivodeship, in north-eastern Poland.

== Transport ==
Roads in Żółtki-Colony:

- E67 Helsinki – Kaunas – Warsaw – Praga
- DK 8 Kudowa-Zdrój - Wrocław - Warsaw - Białystok - Suwałki - Budzisko
