= Kościuki =

- Village
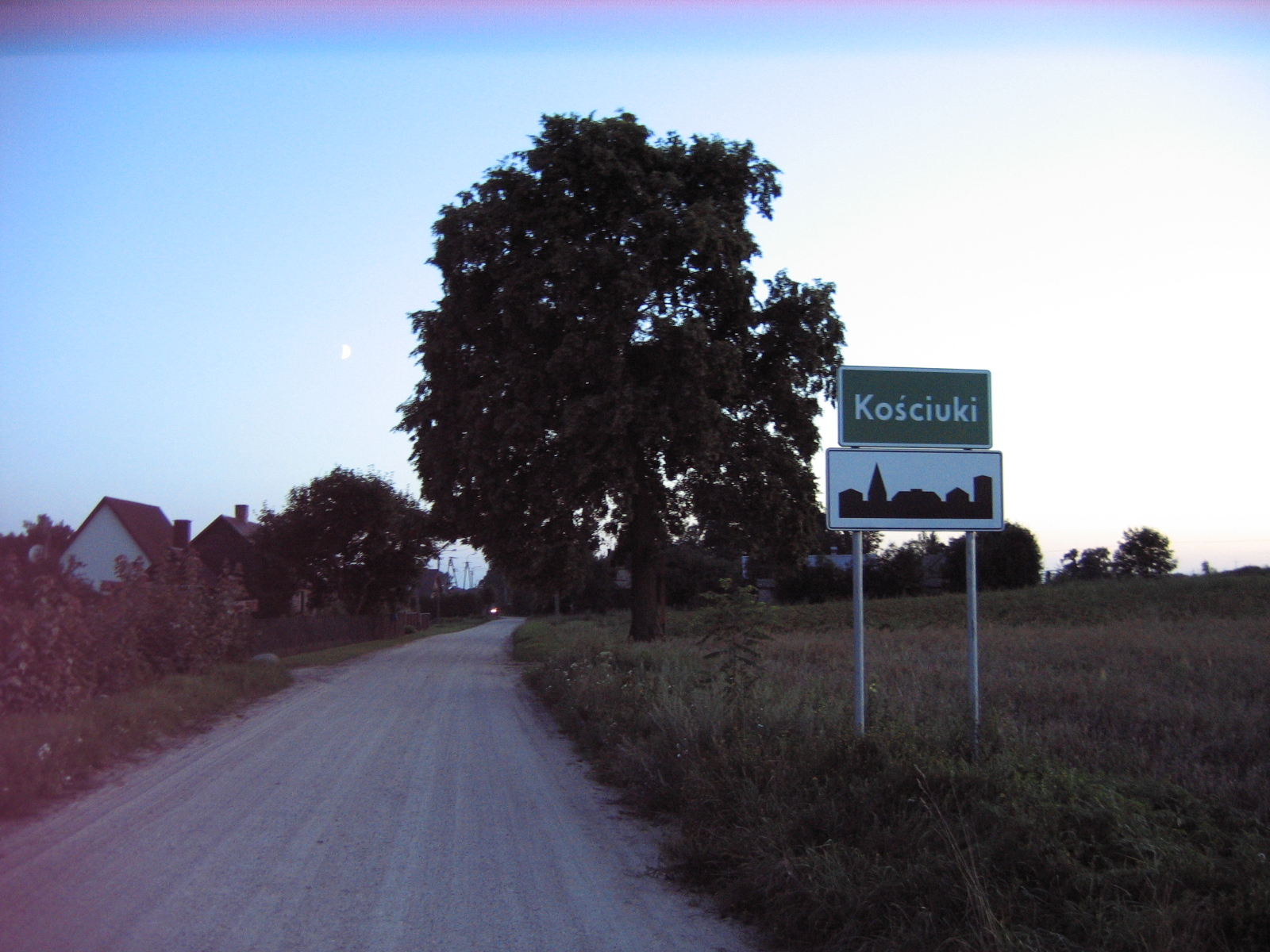

- Location within Poland
- Coordinates: 53°6′N 22°57′E
- Country: Poland
- Voivodeship: Podlaskie
- County: Białystok
- Gmina: Choroszcz

Kościuki [kɔɕˈt͡ɕuki] is a village in the administrative district of Gmina Choroszcz, within Białystok County, Podlaskie Voivodeship, in north-eastern Poland.
