= Rogowo-Majątek =

- Village
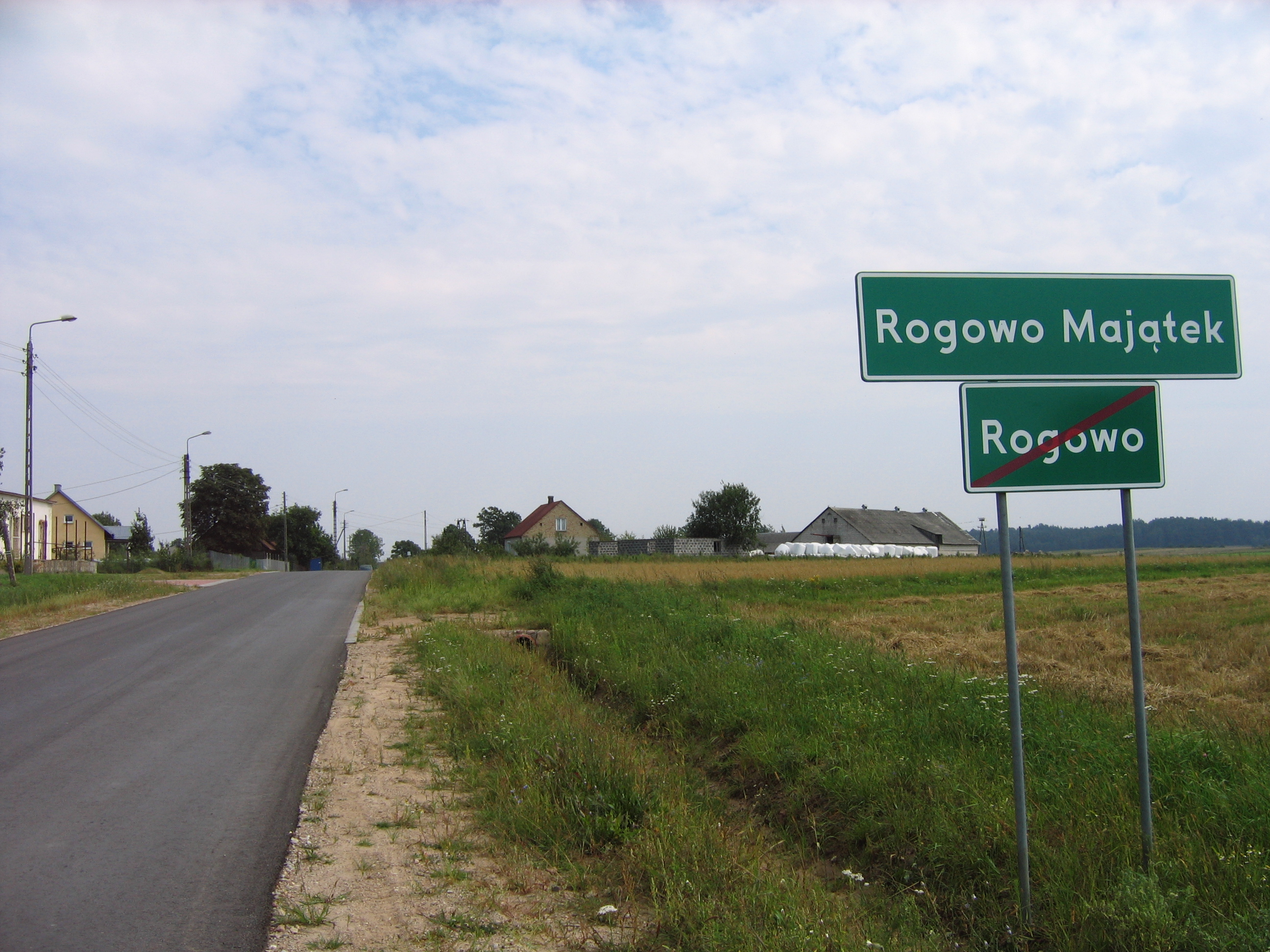

- Location within Poland
- Coordinates: 53°8′28″N 22°54′42″E
- Country: Poland
- Voivodeship: Podlaskie
- County: Białystok
- Gmina: Choroszcz
- Population: 60

Rogowo-Majątek [rɔˈɡɔvɔ maˈjɔntɛk] is a village in the administrative district of Gmina Choroszcz, within Białystok County, Podlaskie Voivodeship, in north-eastern Poland.
