= Czaplino, Podlaskie Voivodeship =

Czaplino
- Village
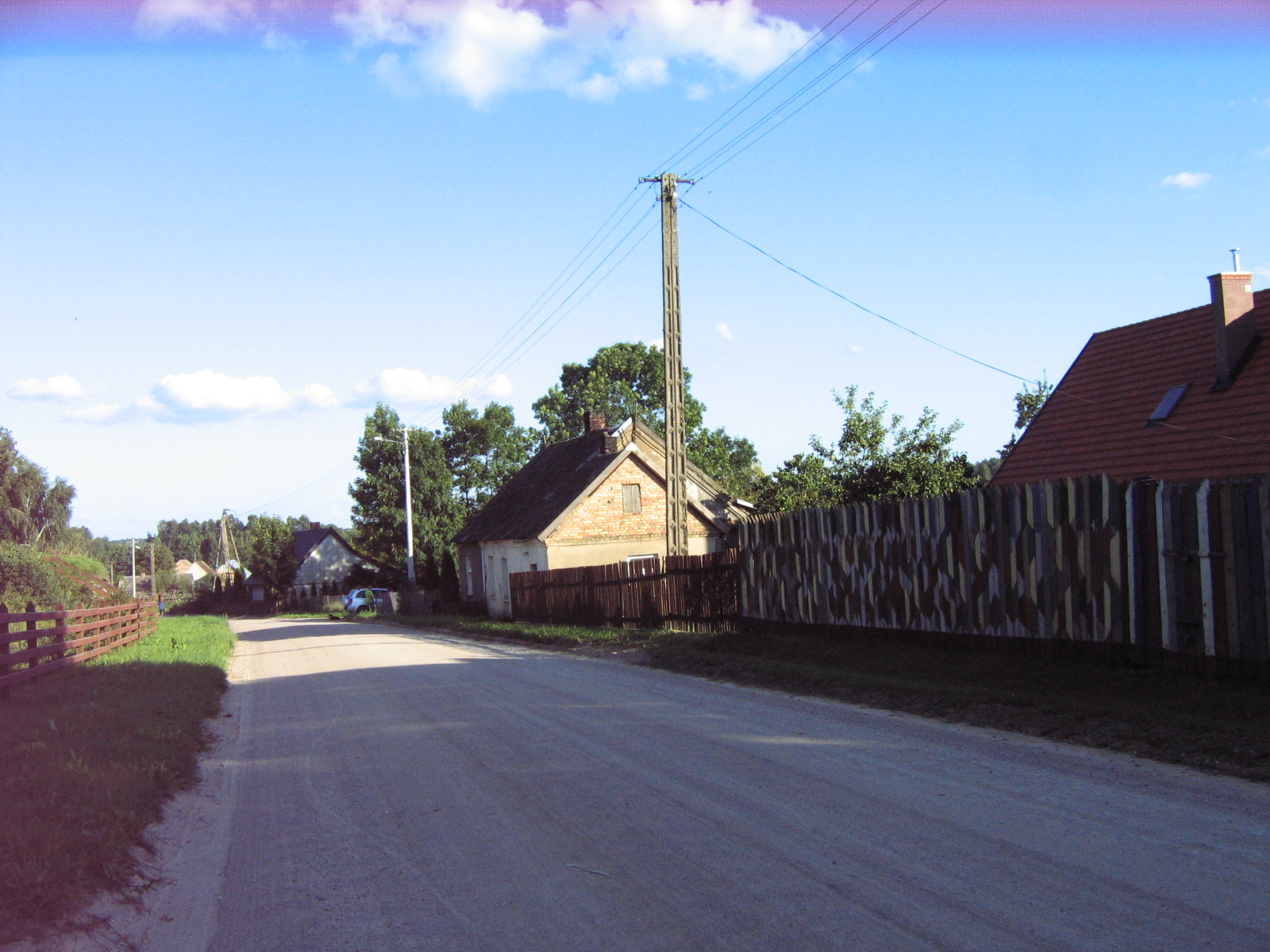

- Location within Poland
- Coordinates: 53°6′N 23°2′E
- Country: Poland
- Voivodeship: Podlaskie
- County: Białystok
- Gmina: Choroszcz
- Population: 120

Czaplino [t͡ʂaˈplinɔ] is a village in the administrative district of Gmina Choroszcz, within Białystok County, Podlaskie Voivodeship, in north-eastern Poland.
