= Złotoria-Kolonia =

- Village
- Location within Poland
- Coordinates: 53°10′37″N 22°53′58″E
- Country: Poland
- Voivodeship: Podlaskie
- County: Białystok
- Gmina: Choroszcz

Złotoria-Kolonia [zwɔˈtɔrja kɔˈlɔɲa] is a village in the administrative district of Gmina Choroszcz, within Białystok County, Podlaskie Voivodeship, in north-eastern Poland.
