= Dzikie =

- Village
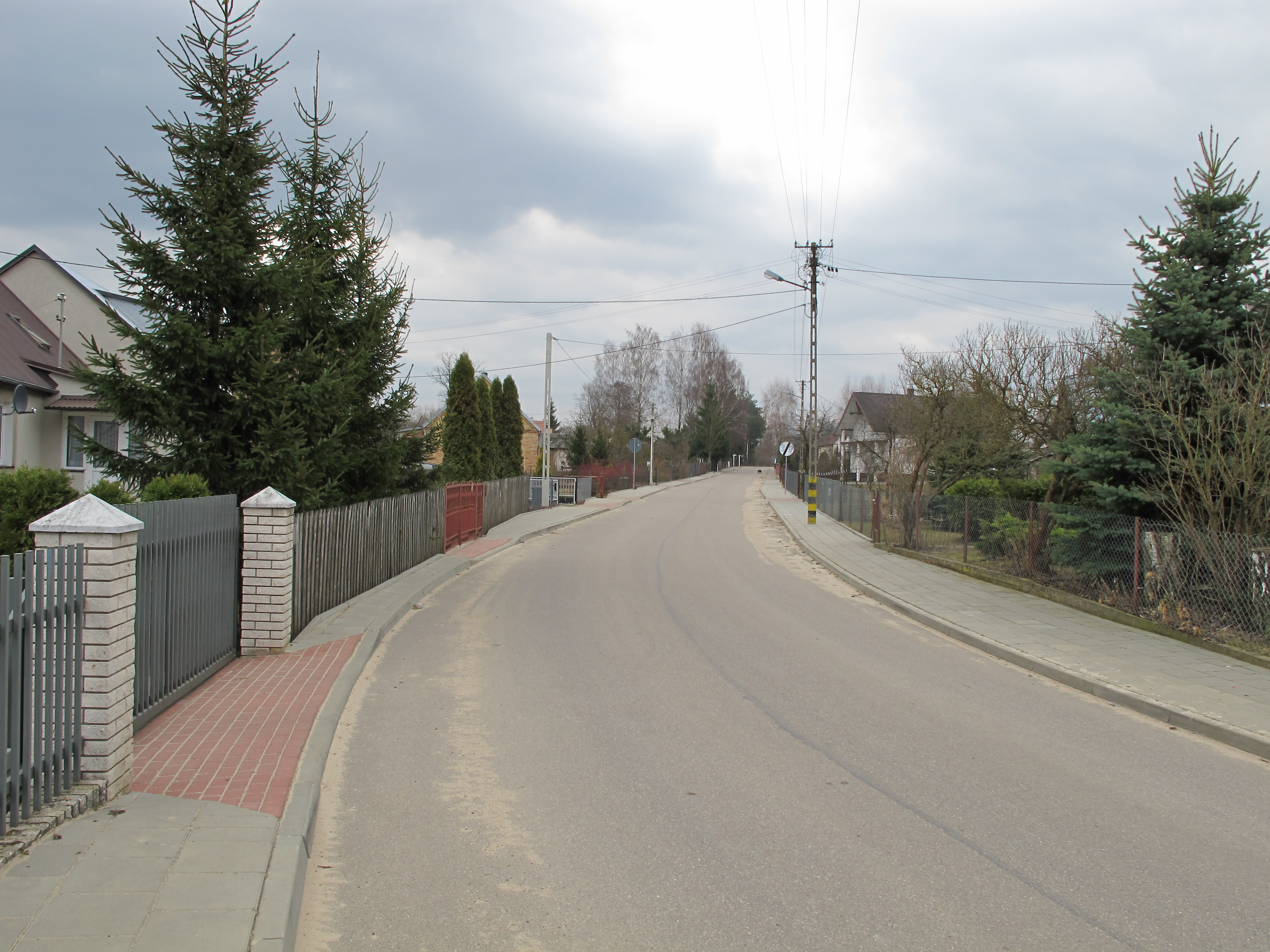

- Location within Poland
- Coordinates: 53°10′42″N 23°0′24″E
- Country: Poland
- Voivodeship: Podlaskie
- County: Białystok
- Gmina: Choroszcz
- Population: 160

Dzikie [ˈd͡ʑikʲɛ] is a village in the administrative district of Gmina Choroszcz, within Białystok County, Podlaskie Voivodeship, in north-eastern Poland.
