= Oliszki, Białystok County =

Oliszki
- Village
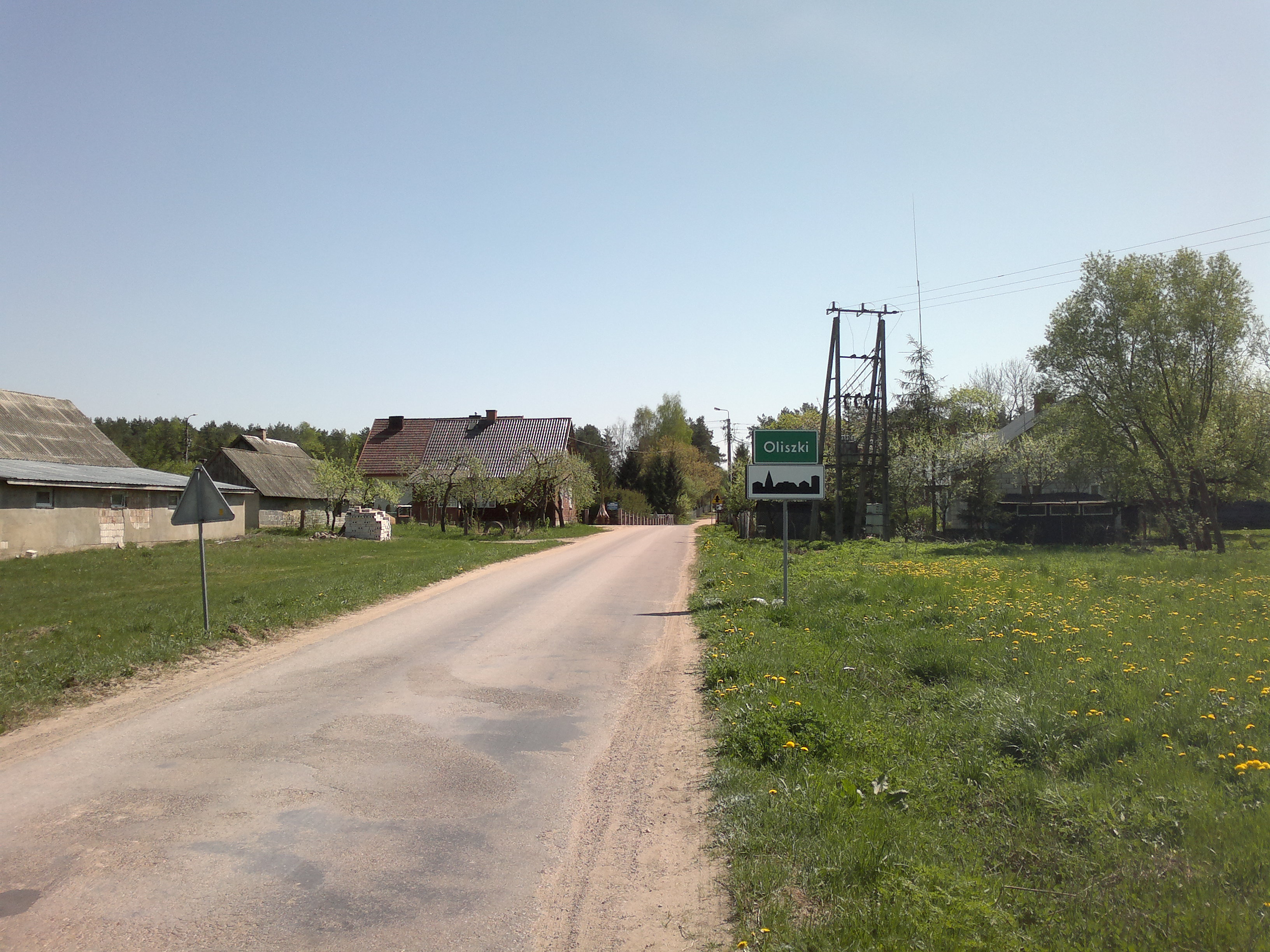

- Location within Poland
- Coordinates: 53°8′N 23°3′E
- Country: Poland
- Voivodeship: Podlaskie
- County: Białystok
- Gmina: Choroszcz

Oliszki [ɔˈliʂki] is a village in the administrative district of Gmina Choroszcz, within Białystok County, Podlaskie Voivodeship, in north-eastern Poland.
