= Żółtki =

- Village
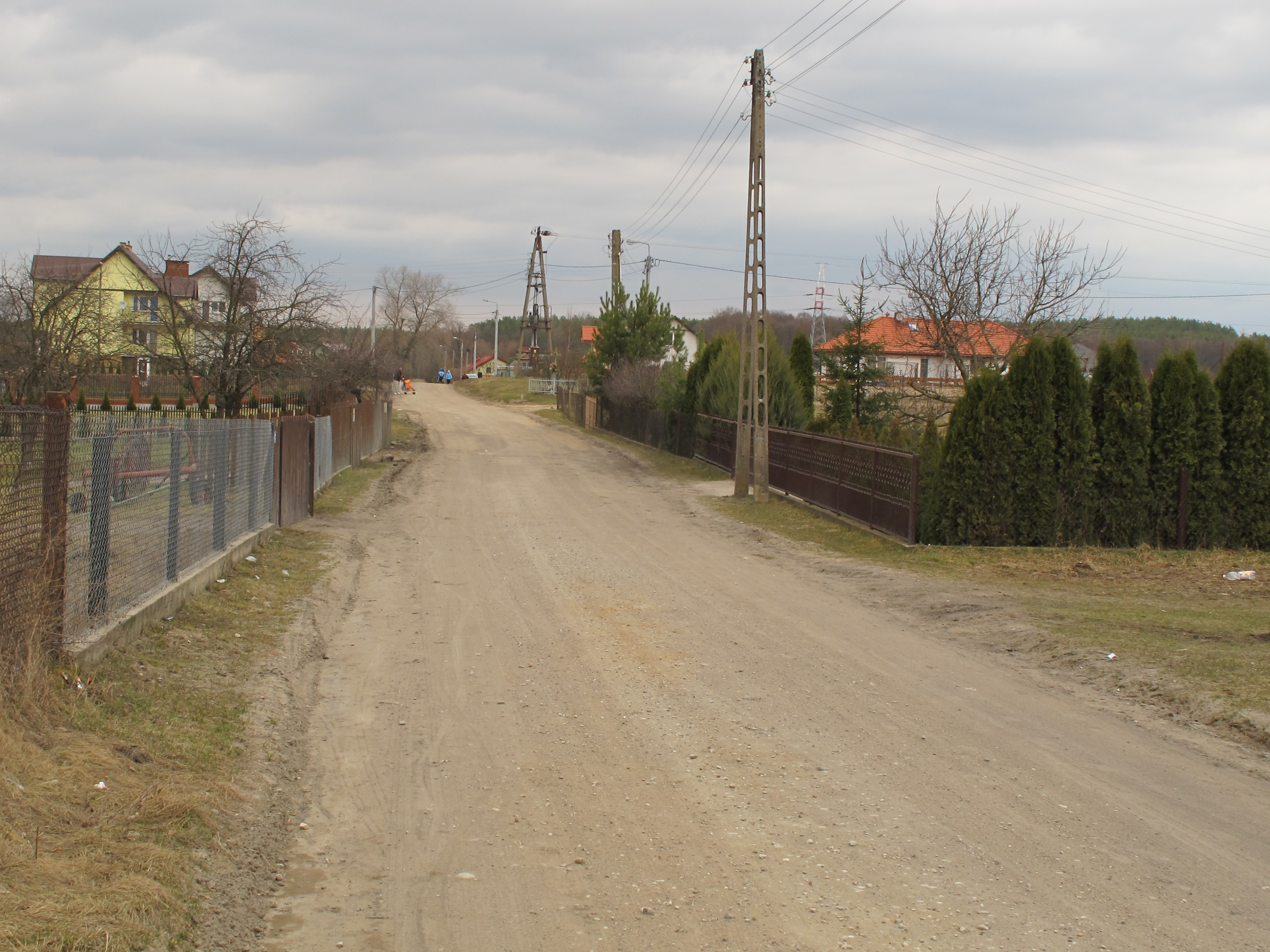
- View of Żółtki

- Location within Poland
- Coordinates: 53°11′N 23°0′E
- Country: Poland
- Voivodeship: Podlaskie
- County: Białystok
- Gmina: Choroszcz
- Population: 335

Żółtki [ˈʐuu̯tki] is a village in the administrative district of Gmina Choroszcz, within Białystok County, Podlaskie Voivodeship, in north-eastern Poland.

== Transport ==
Roads in Żółtki:

- E67 Helsinki – Kaunas – Warsaw – Praga
- DK 8 Kudowa-Zdrój - Wrocław - Warsaw - Białystok - Suwałki - Budzisko
