= Złotoria-Podlesie =

- Village
- Location within Poland
- Coordinates: 53°10′07″N 22°53′08″E
- Country: Poland
- Voivodeship: Podlaskie
- County: Białystok
- Gmina: Choroszcz

Złotoria-Podlesie [zwɔˈtɔrja pɔdˈlɛɕɛ] is a village in the administrative district of Gmina Choroszcz, within Białystok County, Podlaskie Voivodeship, in north-eastern Poland.
