= Pańki, Gmina Choroszcz =

Village in Podlaskie Voivodeship, Poland

Pańki, Poland
- Village
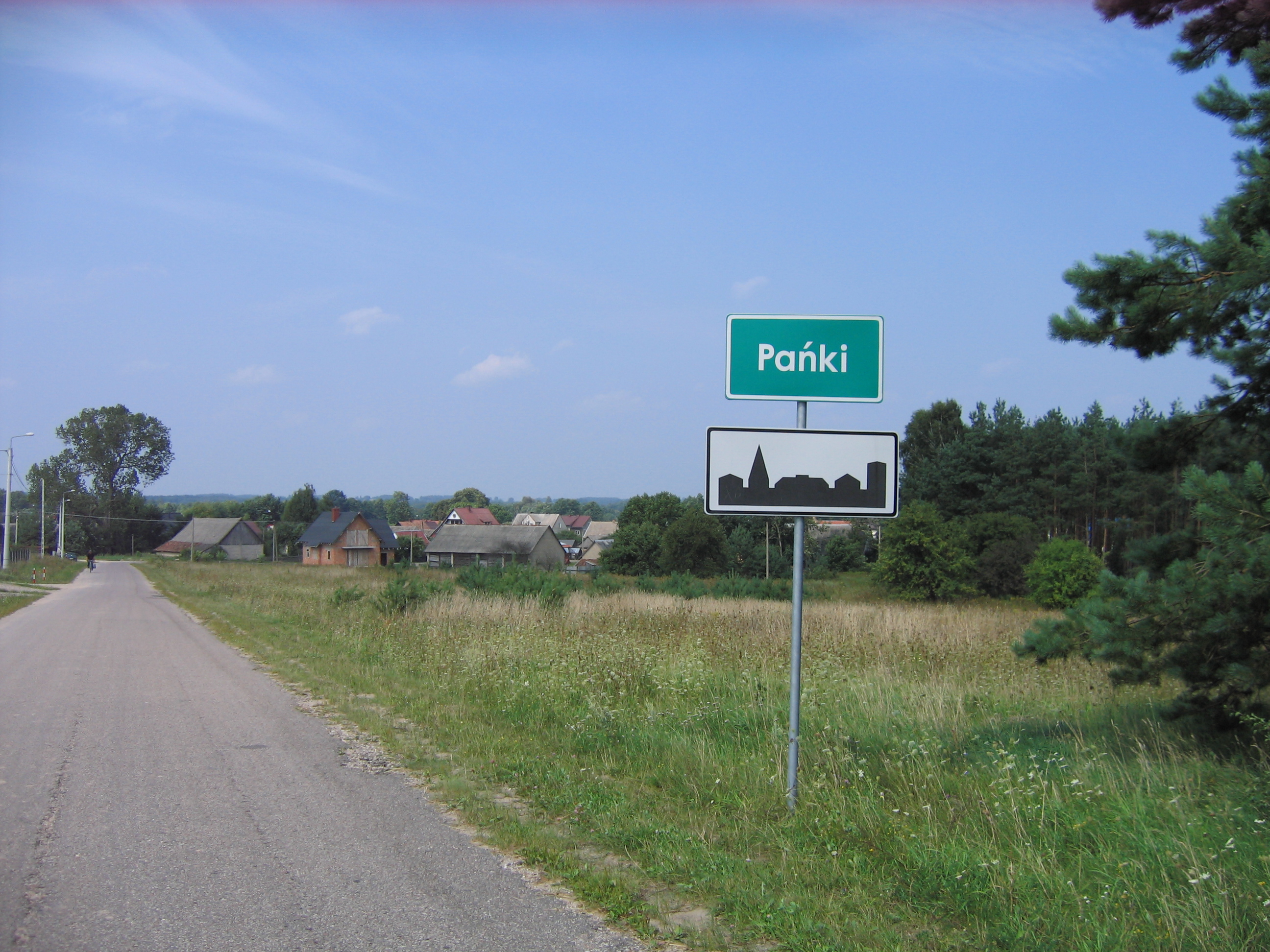

- Location within Poland
- Coordinates: 53°7′41.83″N 22°52′29.98″E
- Country: Poland
- Voivodeship: Podlaskie
- County: Białystok
- Gmina: Choroszcz
- Population: 345

Pańki [ˈpaɲki] is a village in the administrative district of Gmina Choroszcz, within Białystok County, Podlaskie Voivodeship, in north-eastern Poland.
