= Śliwno, Podlaskie Voivodeship =

Śliwno
- Village
- Location within Poland
- Coordinates: 53°5′17″N 22°50′24″E
- Country: Poland
- Voivodeship: Podlaskie
- County: Białystok
- Gmina: Choroszcz
- Population (approx.): 65

Śliwno [ˈɕlivnɔ] is a village in the administrative district of Gmina Choroszcz, within Białystok County, Podlaskie Voivodeship, in north-eastern Poland.
