= Izbiszcze =

- Village
- Location within Poland
- Coordinates: 53°5′N 22°52′E
- Country: Poland
- Voivodeship: Podlaskie
- County: Białystok
- Gmina: Choroszcz
- Population: 305

Izbiszcze [izˈbiʂt͡ʂɛ] is a village in the administrative district of Gmina Choroszcz, within Białystok County, Podlaskie Voivodeship, in north-eastern Poland.
