= Gajowniki =

- Village
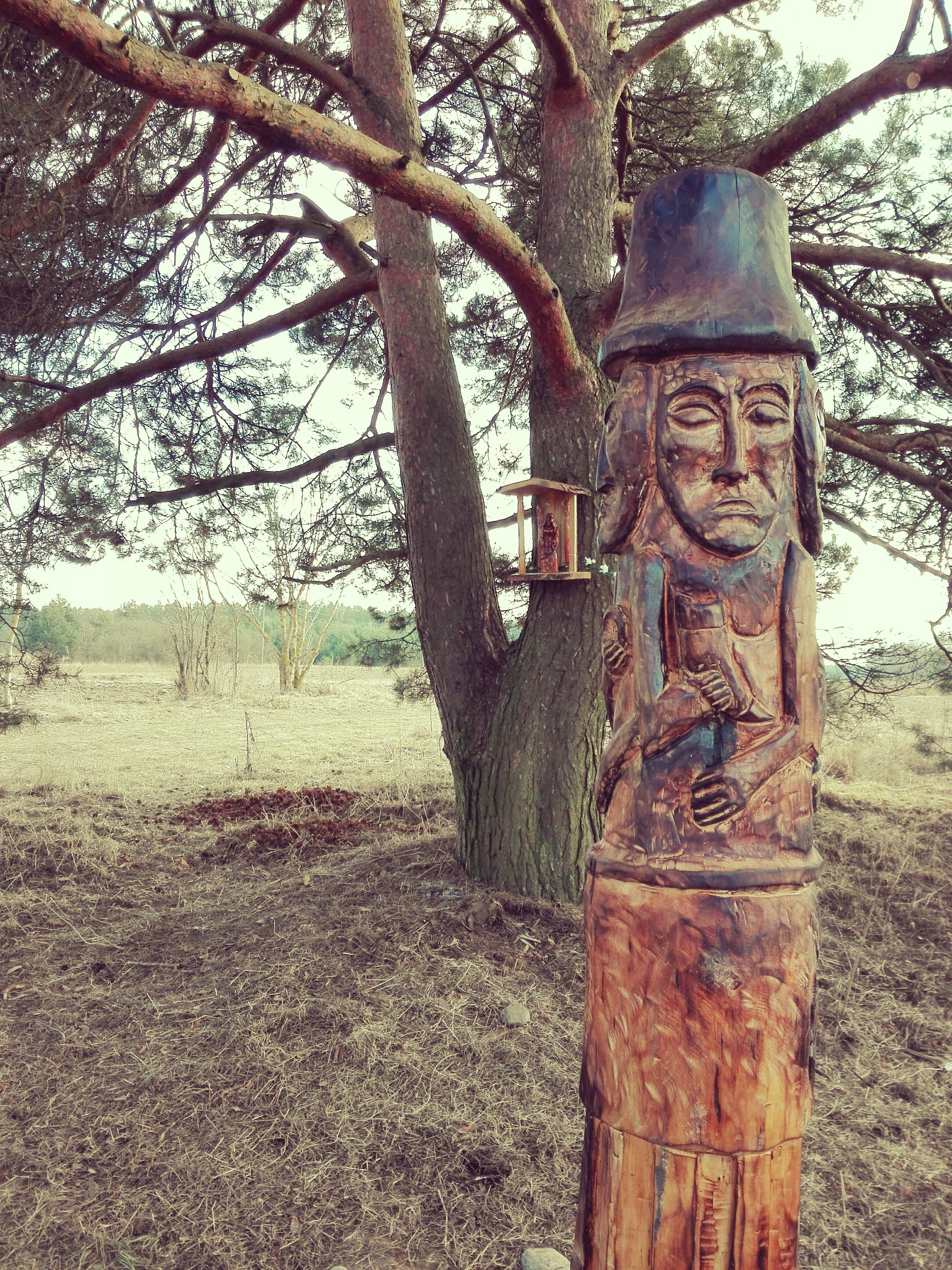

- Location within Poland
- Coordinates: 53°6′8″N 22°58′25″E
- Country: Poland
- Voivodeship: Podlaskie
- County: Białystok
- Gmina: Choroszcz

Gajowniki [ɡajɔvˈniki] is a village in the administrative district of Gmina Choroszcz, within Białystok County, Podlaskie Voivodeship, in north-eastern Poland.
