= Rogówek, Podlaskie Voivodeship =

Rogówek
- Village
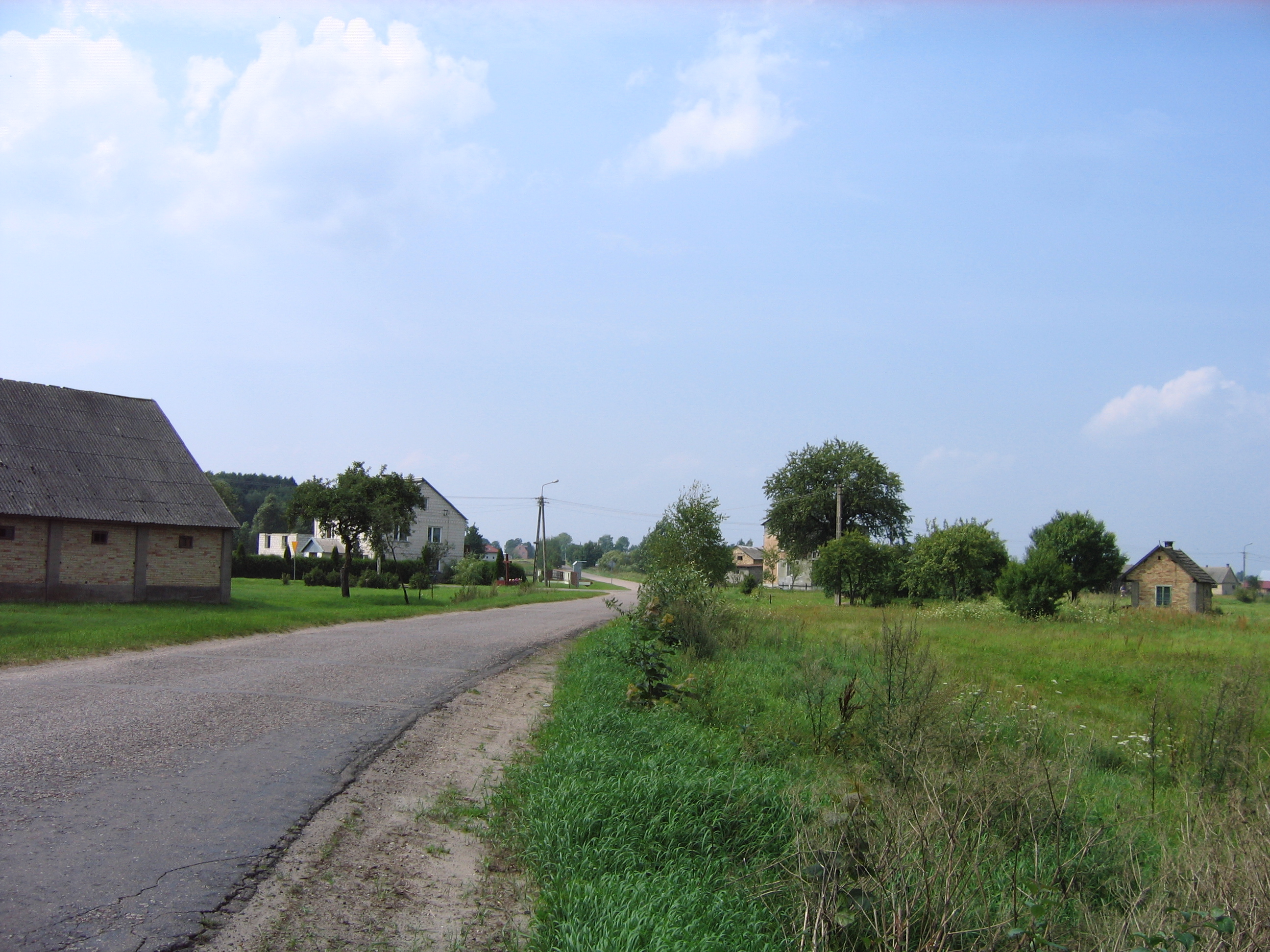

- Location within Poland
- Coordinates: 53°9′N 22°56′E
- Country: Poland
- Voivodeship: Podlaskie
- County: Białystok
- Gmina: Choroszcz

Rogówek [rɔˈɡuvɛk] is a village in the administrative district of Gmina Choroszcz, within Białystok County, Podlaskie Voivodeship, in north-eastern Poland.
