= Konowały =

- Village
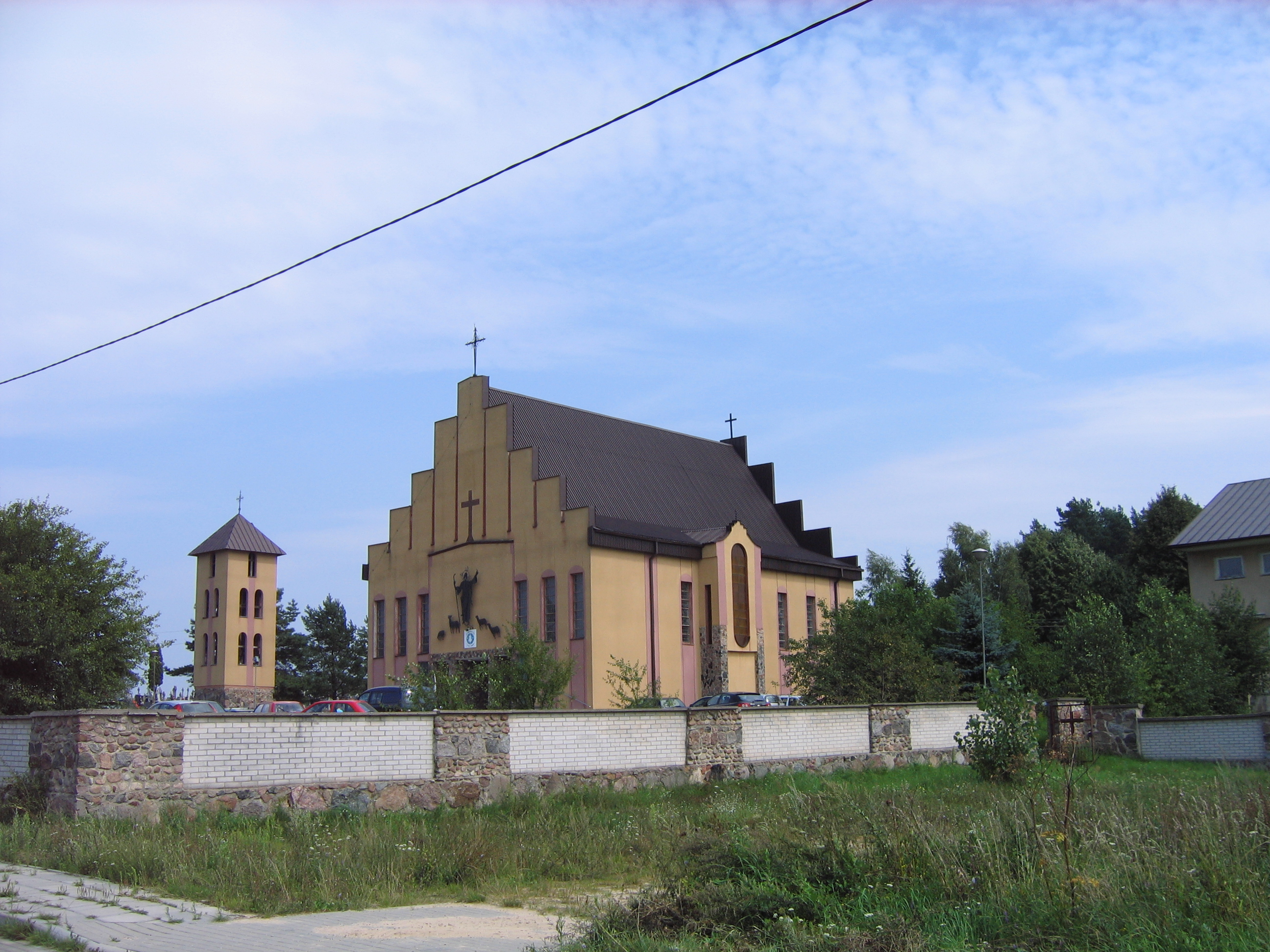
- Church of the Sacred Heart

- Location within Poland
- Coordinates: 53°7′N 22°54′E
- Country: Poland
- Voivodeship: Podlaskie
- County: Białystok
- Gmina: Choroszcz

Population
  - Total: 130

Konowały [kɔnɔˈvawɨ] is a village in the administrative district of Gmina Choroszcz, within Białystok County, Podlaskie Voivodeship, in north-eastern Poland.
