= Gajowniki-Kolonia =

- Village
- Location within Poland
- Coordinates: 53°06′58″N 22°58′55″E
- Country: Poland
- Voivodeship: Podlaskie
- County: Białystok
- Gmina: Choroszcz

Gajowniki-Kolonia [ɡajɔvˈniki kɔˈlɔɲa] is a village in the administrative district of Gmina Choroszcz, within Białystok County, Podlaskie Voivodeship, in north-eastern Poland.
