= Ogrodniki Barszczewskie =

Ogrodniki
- Village
- Location within Poland
- Coordinates: 54°07′45″N 23°27′50″E
- Country: Poland
- Voivodeship: Podlaskie
- County: Białystok
- Gmina: Choroszcz

Ogrodniki [ɔɡrɔdˈniki] (until 2009 Ogrodniki Barszczewskie) is a village in the administrative district of Gmina Choroszcz, within Białystok County, Podlaskie Voivodeship, in north-eastern Poland.
