= Kruszewo, Podlaskie Voivodeship =

Kruszewo
- Village
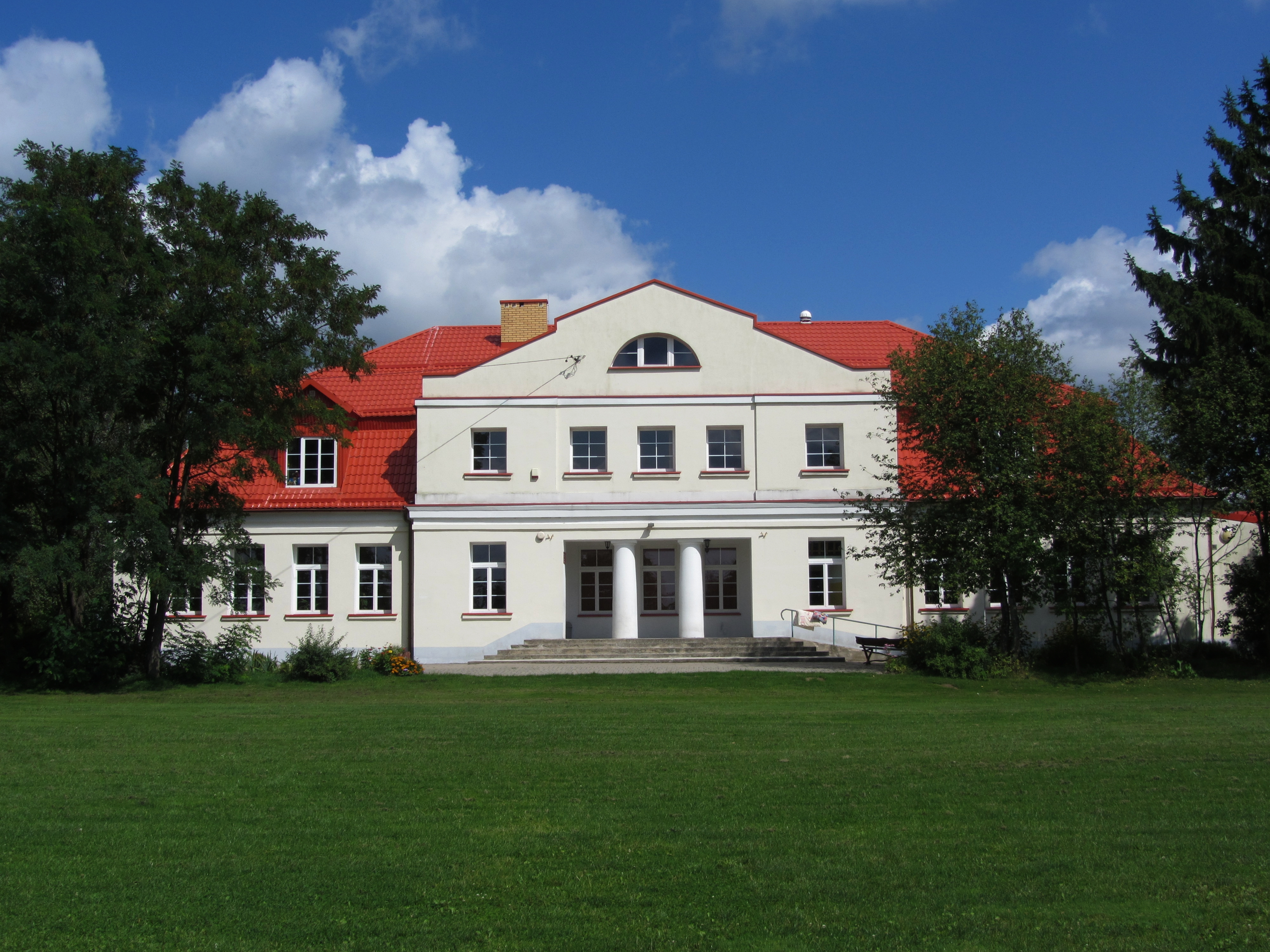

- Location within Poland
- Coordinates: 53°7′N 22°50′E
- Country: Poland
- Voivodeship: Podlaskie
- County: Białystok
- Gmina: Choroszcz
- Population: 232

Kruszewo [kruˈʂɛvɔ] is a village in the administrative district of Gmina Choroszcz, within Białystok County, Podlaskie Voivodeship, in north-eastern Poland.
