= Zawady, Gmina Turośń Kościelna =

Zawady
- Village
- Location within Poland
- Coordinates: 53°4′36″N 22°57′57″E
- Country: Poland
- Voivodeship: Podlaskie
- County: Białystok
- Gmina: Turośń Kościelna

Zawady [zaˈvadɨ] is a village in the administrative district of Gmina Turośń Kościelna, within Białystok County, Podlaskie Voivodeship, in north-eastern Poland.
