= Niewodnica Korycka =

- Village
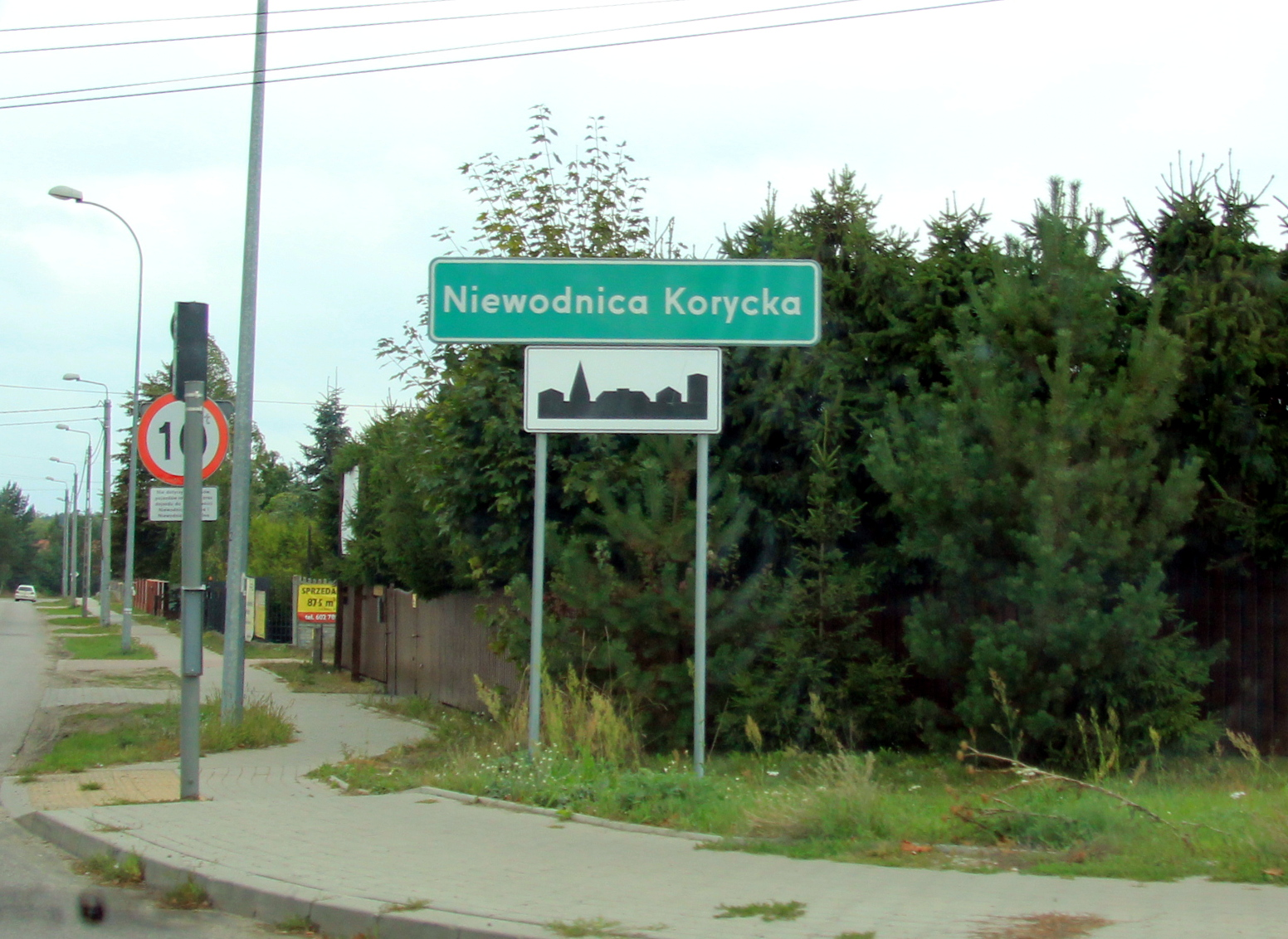

- Location within Poland
- Coordinates: 53°5′N 23°5′E
- Country: Poland
- Voivodeship: Podlaskie
- County: Białystok
- Gmina: Turośń Kościelna

Population
  - Total: 120
- Time zone: UTC+1 (CET)
  - Summer (DST): UTC+2 (CEST)
- Vehicle registration: BIA

Niewodnica Korycka [ɲɛvɔdˈnit͡sa kɔˈrɨt͡ska] is a village in the administrative district of Gmina Turośń Kościelna, within Białystok County, Podlaskie Voivodeship, in north-eastern Poland.

== History ==
Following the German-Soviet invasion of Poland, which started World War II in September 1939, the village was occupied by the Soviet Union until 1941 and then by Germany until 1944. A battle between the Polish partisans of the Home Army and the German occupiers was fought at Niewodnica Korycka in May 1943.
