= Tadas Mincė =

Lithuanian basketball player (born 1993)

No. 4 – Lietkabelis-2
- Position: Shooting guard
- League: NKL

Personal information
- Born: July 31, 1993 (age 33) Panevėžys, Lithuania
- Listed height: 6 ft 4 in (1.93 m)
- Listed weight: 170 lb (77 kg)

Career information
- High school: Panevėžio 5-oji gimnazija
- College: ISM (2012–present)
- Playing career: 2015–present

Career history
- 2015–present: Lietkabelis-2 (Lithuania)

Tadas Mincė (born 31 July 1993) also known as Mincė is a Lithuanian professional basketball player who plays as a shooting guard for Lietkabelis-2 in NKL.
