= Topilec =

- Village
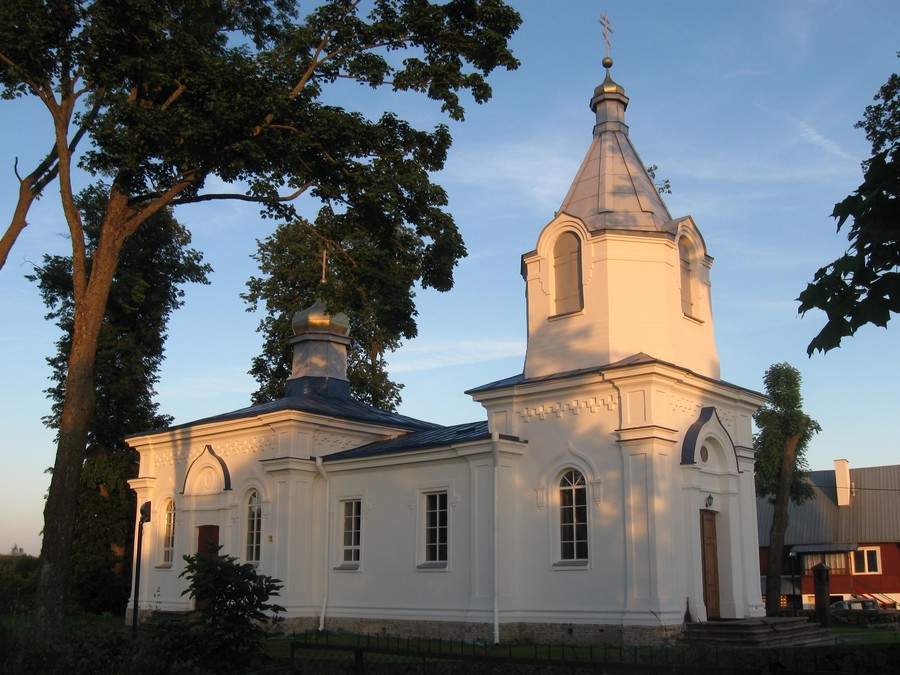
- Saint Nicholas Church

- Location within Poland
- Coordinates: 53°5′N 22°57′E
- Country: Poland
- Voivodeship: Podlaskie
- County: Białystok
- Gmina: Turośń Kościelna

Topilec [tɔˈpilɛt͡s] is a village in the administrative district of Gmina Turośń Kościelna, within Białystok County, Podlaskie Voivodeship, in north-eastern Poland.
