= Mińce =

Village in Gmina Choroszcz, Poland

- Village
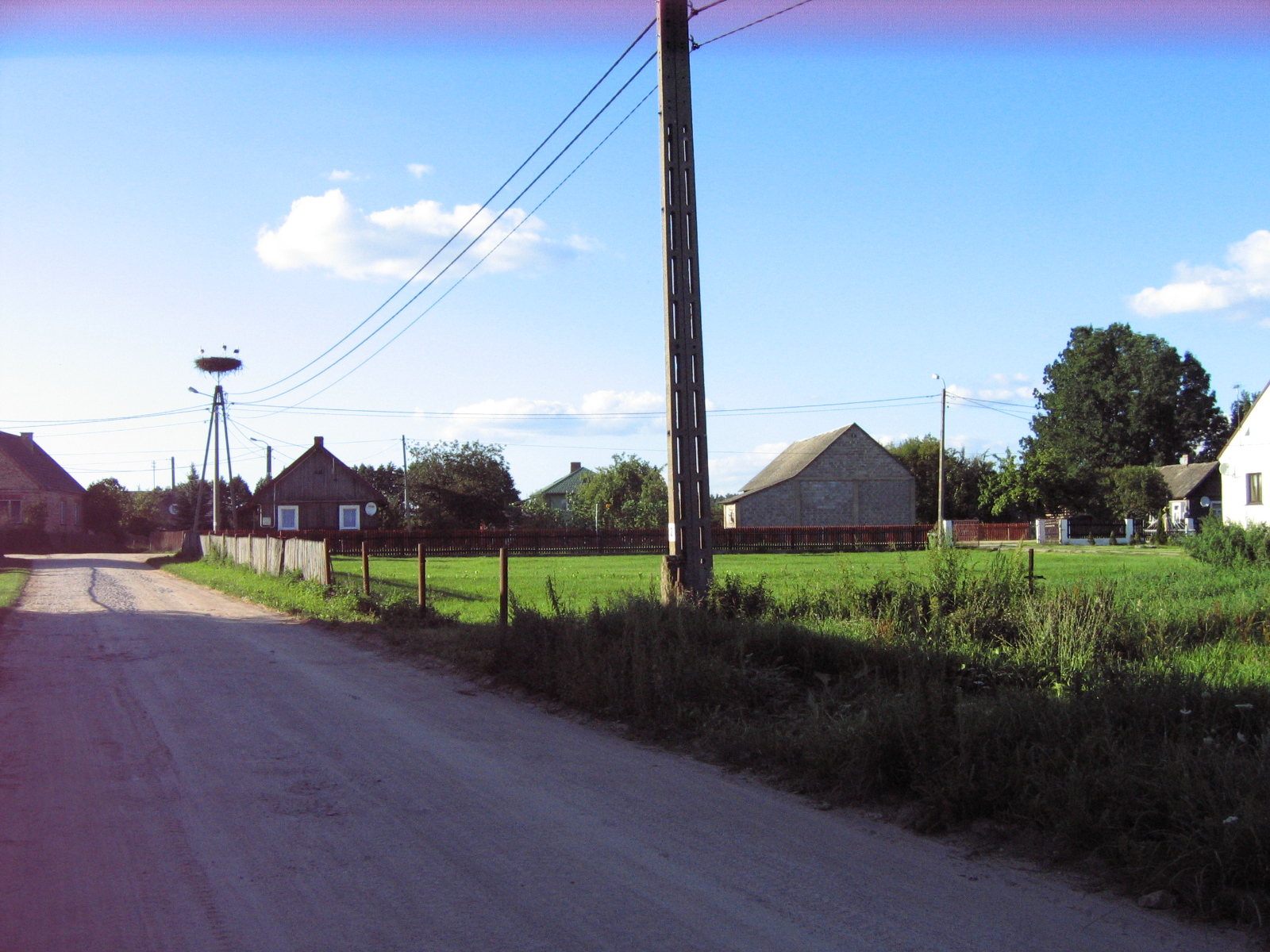

- Location within Poland
- Coordinates: 53°05′11″N 23°00′38″E
- Country: Poland
- Voivodeship: Podlaskie
- County: Białystok
- Gmina: Choroszcz

Mińce [ˈmiɲt͡sɛ] is a village in the administrative district of Gmina Choroszcz, within Białystok County, Podlaskie Voivodeship, in north-eastern Poland.
