= Zalesiany, Podlaskie Voivodeship =

Zalesiany
- Village
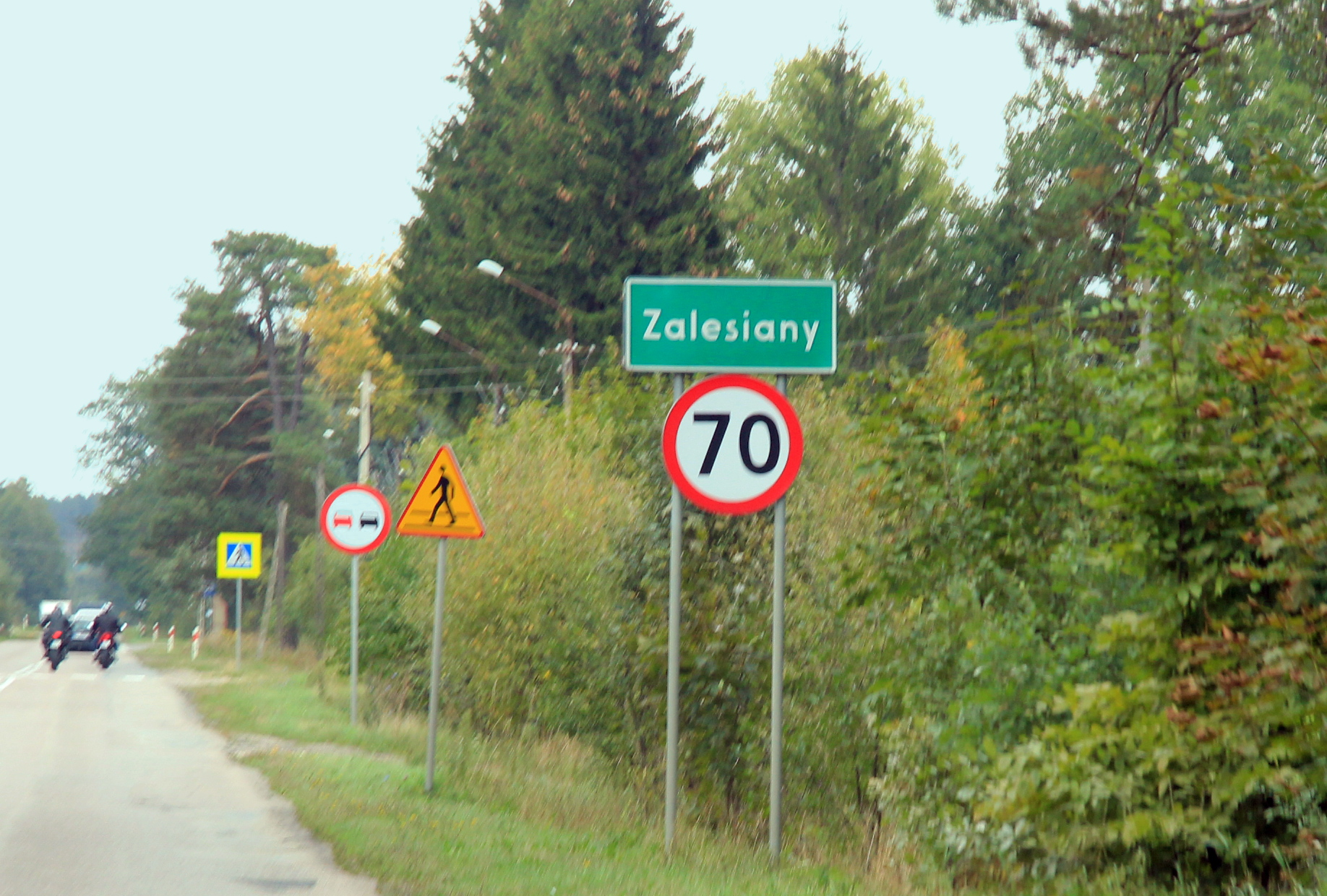

- Location within Poland
- Coordinates: 53°4′N 23°4′E
- Country: Poland
- Voivodeship: Podlaskie
- County: Białystok
- Gmina: Turośń Kościelna

Zalesiany [zalɛˈɕanɨ] is a village in the administrative district of Gmina Turośń Kościelna, within Białystok County, Podlaskie Voivodeship, in north-eastern Poland.
