= Barszczówka =

- Village
- Location within Poland
- Coordinates: 53°3′N 23°1′E
- Country: Poland
- Voivodeship: Podlaskie
- County: Białystok
- Gmina: Turośń Kościelna
- Population: 150

Barszczówka [barʂˈt͡ʂufka] is a village in the administrative district of Gmina Turośń Kościelna, within Białystok County, Podlaskie Voivodeship, in north-eastern Poland.
