= Barszczewo, Gmina Choroszcz =

Barszczewo
- Village
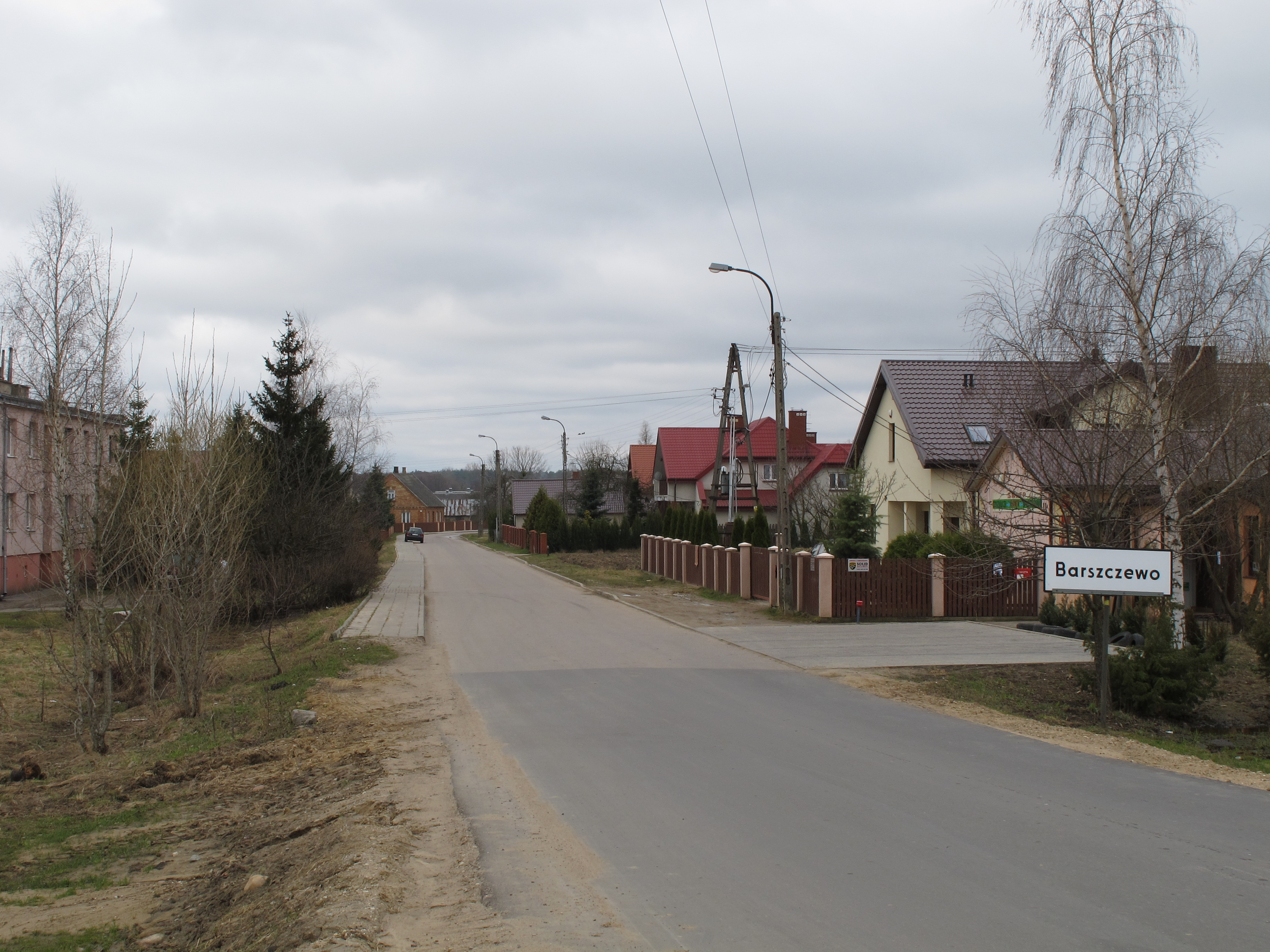
- View of Barszczewo, April 2010

- Location within Poland
- Coordinates: 53°7′30″N 23°0′44″E
- Country: Poland
- Voivodeship: Podlaskie
- County: Białystok
- Gmina: Choroszcz
- Population: 396

Barszczewo [barʂˈt͡ʂɛvɔ] is a village in the administrative district of Gmina Choroszcz, within Białystok County, Podlaskie Voivodeship, in north-eastern Poland.
