= Niewodnica Kościelna =

Village in Podlaskie Voivodeship, Poland

- Village
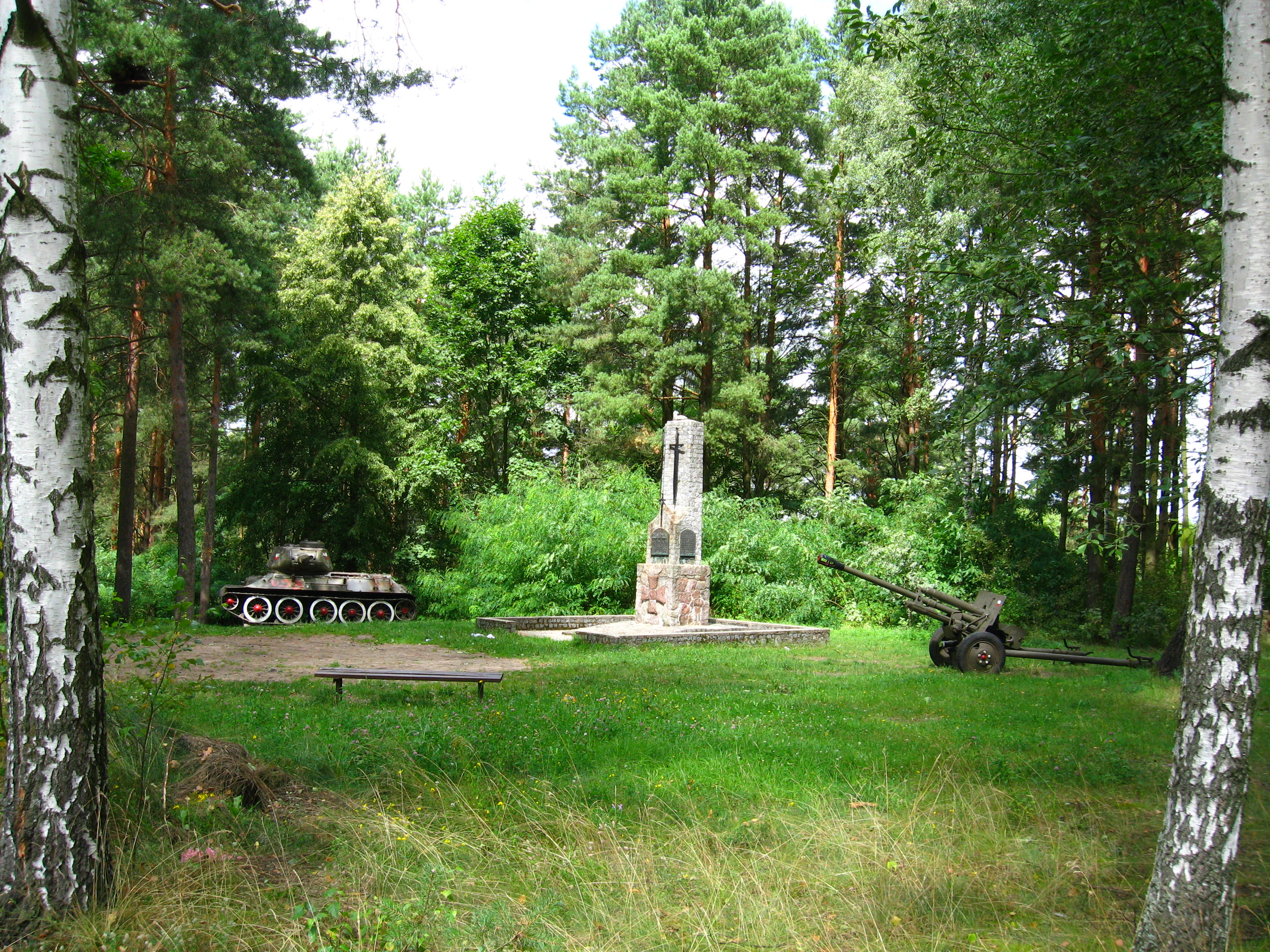

- Location within Poland
- Coordinates: 53°4′56″N 23°3′16″E
- Country: Poland
- Voivodeship: Podlaskie
- County: Białystok
- Gmina: Turośń Kościelna
- Population: 330

Niewodnica Kościelna [ɲɛvɔdˈnit͡sa kɔɕˈt͡ɕɛlna] is a village in the administrative district of Gmina Turośń Kościelna, within Białystok County, Podlaskie Voivodeship, in north-eastern Poland.
