= Tołcze, Białystok County =

Tołcze
- Village
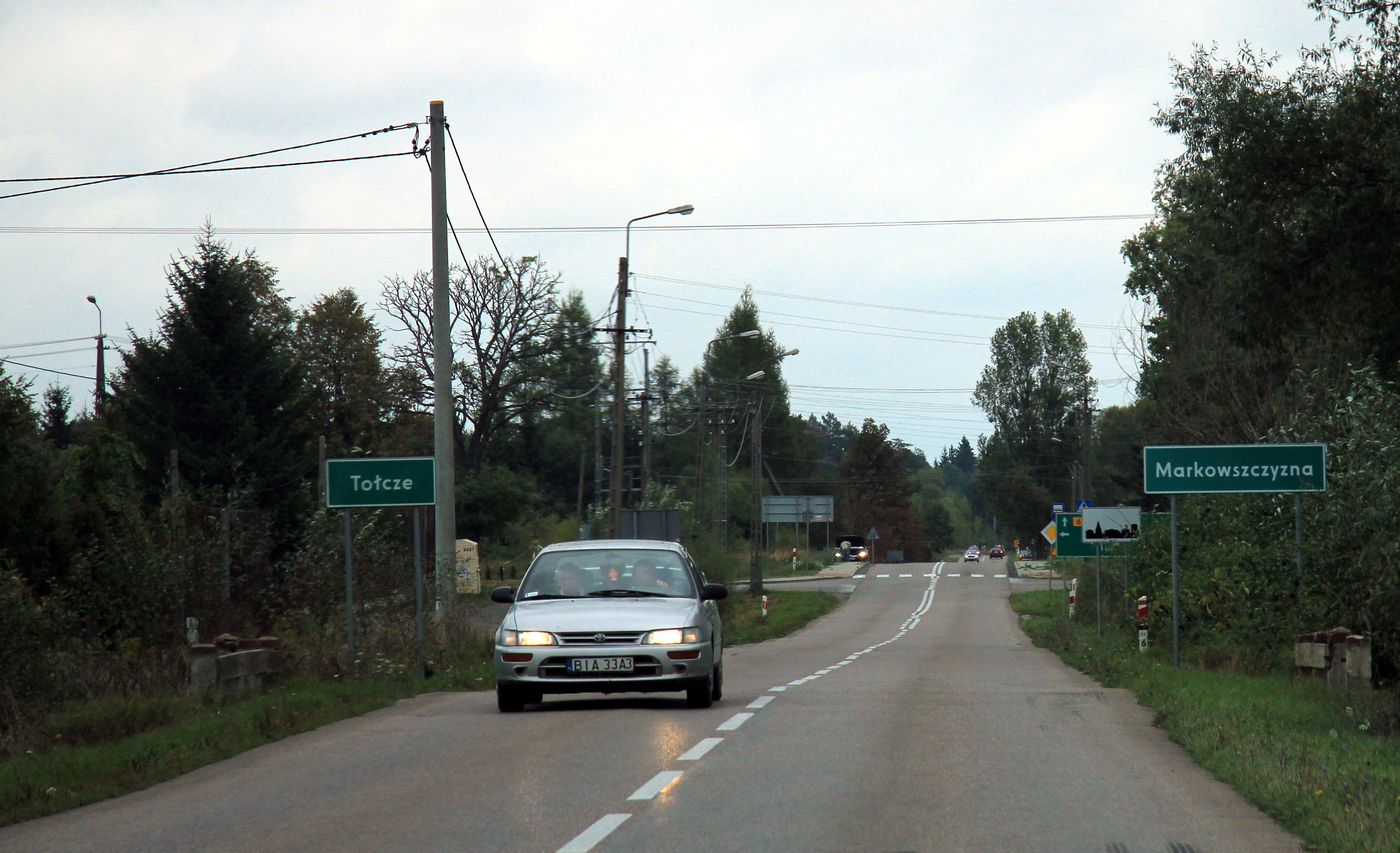

- Location within Poland
- Coordinates: 53°4′N 23°3′E
- Country: Poland
- Voivodeship: Podlaskie
- County: Białystok
- Gmina: Turośń Kościelna
- Population: 170

Tołcze [ˈtɔu̯t͡ʂɛ] is a village in the administrative district of Gmina Turośń Kościelna, within Białystok County, Podlaskie Voivodeship, in north-eastern Poland.
