= Łapy =

Town in Podlaskie Voivodeship, Poland

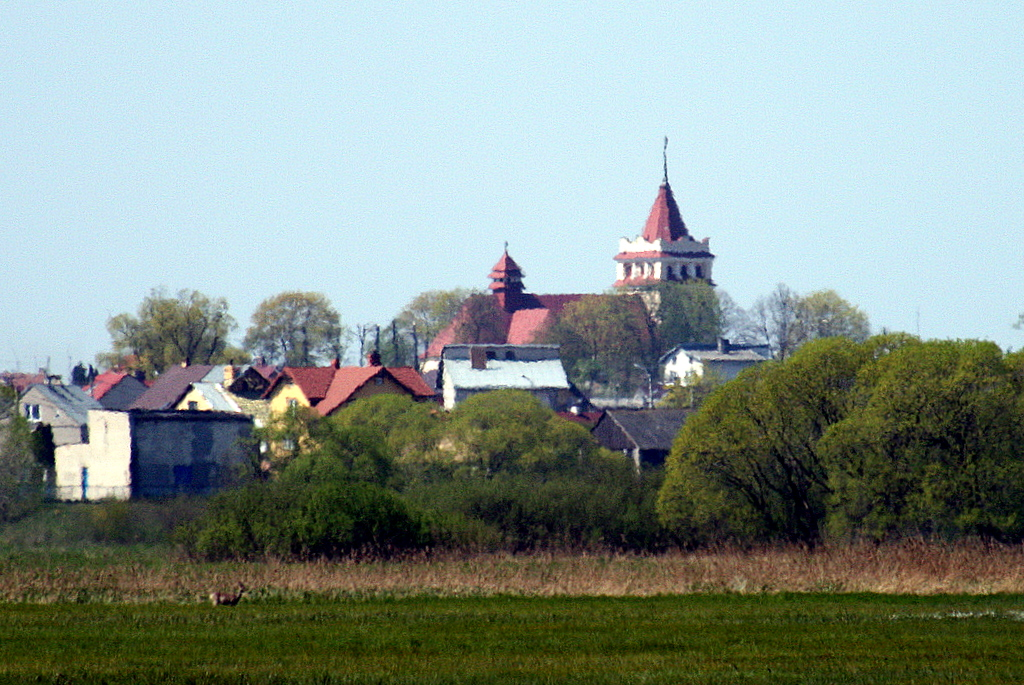
- Łapy's skyline featuring St. Peter and Paul's church

- Flag Coat of arms

- Location within Poland
- Coordinates: 52°59′N 22°53′E
- Country: Poland
- Voivodeship: Podlaskie
- County: Białystok
- Gmina: Łapy
- Town charter: 7 January 1925

Government
  - Mayor: Wiktor Brzosko

Area
  - Total: 12.14 km^{2} (4.69 sq mi)
- Highest elevation: 130 m (430 ft)
- Lowest elevation: 120 m (390 ft)

Population (2010)
  - Total: 16,049
  - Density: 1,322/km^{2} (3,424/sq mi)
- Time zone: UTC+1 (CET)
  - Summer (DST): UTC+2 (CEST)
- Postal code: 18-100 to 18-101
- Area code: (+48) 85
- Vehicle registration: BIA

Łapy [ˈwapɨ] is a town in north-eastern Poland, in Białystok County, Podlaskie Voivodeship; the administrative centre of the urban-rural gmina Łapy. It is situated in the North Podlasie Lowland, on the river Narew.

According to data from 31 December 2010, the town had 16,049 inhabitants.

Situated here are the former Railway Fleet Repair Works, a dairy, and the sugar refinery closed in February 2008. Now, Łapy is a medical and educational centre for the region of the former Łapy county.

== Location ==
The town of Łapy is located in north-eastern Poland. According to Kondracki's division of Poland into physico-geographical regions, the town of Łapy sits on North-Podlasie Plain, over the Upper Valley of Narew. The town of Łapy lies by the Narew river. The terrain is elevated here from 120 to 130 metres.

Included in Białystok agglomeration, the town is situated in the buffer zone of Narew National Park.

According to data from 1 January 2010, the town area then was 12.14 km^{2} (4.69 sq mi).

Between 1954 and 1975 Łapy was the administrative centre of Łapy County of Białystok Voivodeship. Between 1975 and 1998 the voivodeship was smaller.

=== Residential areas ===
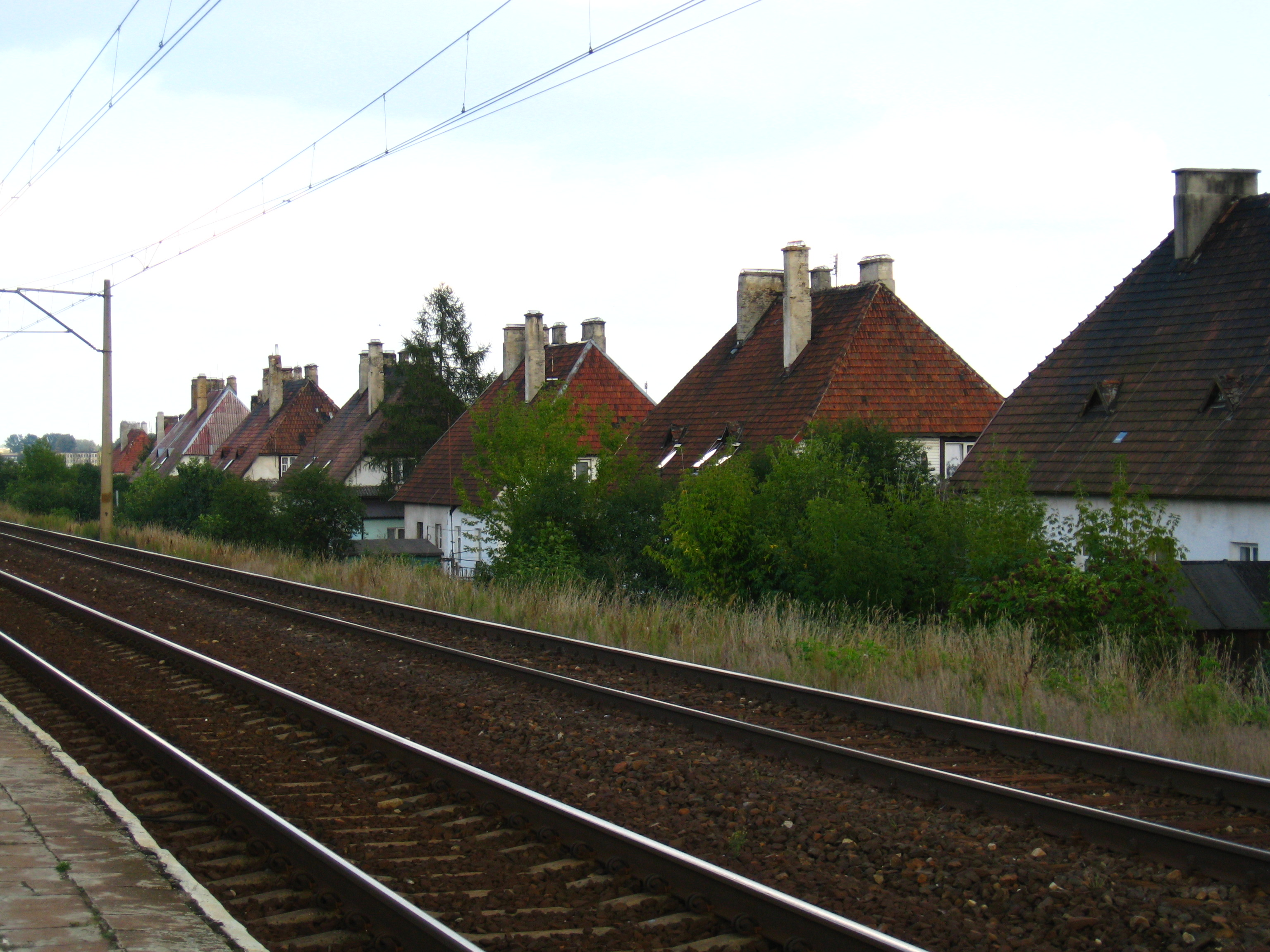
Railwaymen's settlement Osse

Presently Łapy comprises the following parts:

- Barwiki
- Bociany
- Goździki
- Leśniki
- Osse
- Wity
- Wygwizdowo
- Zięciuki

== History ==
=== Foundation ===
The name 'Łapy' is of Masovian origin, and it initially represented a soubriquet of the kin, who founded the settlement on Narew. A legend links the foundation of the town with the nobleman Łappa of the Lubicz coat of arms, who settled down here during the 15th-century Masovian colonisation.

The first historical records of these lands come from the early 13th century. It is known that in 1375 Płonka Kościelna was an independent parish. Firstly Łapy was a backwater where the gentry cultivated patriotic traditions. Soon as a result of the village's development, new settlements emerged on the eastern and the western banks of the river Narew, which was a water trade route from Suraż to Gdańsk in 16th and 17th centuries, and after World War II from Puszcza Białowieska to Tykocin; and at the east side of the high road from Suraż to Płonka.

=== Expansion ===
Following the expansion of the family, a series of backwaters were founded, including Rechy, Brusięta, Barwiki, Korczaki, Pluśniaki, Wągle, Wity, Zięciuki, Kosmyki, Łazie, Stryjce, Wojtysze. Some of those names disappeared replaced by others, such as: Goździki, Dębowizna, Bociany, Leśniki. After the Third Partition of Poland, in 1795, Łapy fell to the Prussian Partition. In 1807, after the Tilsit Peace Treaty, it became a part of the short-lived Polish Duchy of Warsaw, and after its dissolution, in 1815, it passed to so-called Congress Poland in the Russian Partition of Poland. An important event for the future history of Łapy was Napoleonic army's marching through twice in 1812. In the 1820s the backwaters had 1000 inhabitants and 180 houses. In 1825, a fusion of six backwaters (Łapy-Barwiki, Łapy-Leśniki, Łapy-Zięciuki, Łapy-Wity, Łapy-Goździki, Łapy-Bociany) produced the farm settlement of Łapy.

=== Industrialisation ===
Łapy owes its development to the Saint Petersburg–Warsaw Railway with a station here, opened on 15 December 1862, and to the French having built here the works for repairing steam locomotives and carriages the same year. That caused an influx of tradesmen and labourers not only from the nearby villages, but also from distant Polish locations and from the Russian Empire.

In the beginning of the January Uprising, the railway station was captured by a Polish insurgent detachment of Władysław Cichorski nom de guerre "Zameczek" on the night of 22–23 January 1863, and then recaptured by the Russians on 27 January 1863. Further clashes between Polish insurgents and Russian troops were fought in Łapy on 11 and 18 July 1863. Following World War I, Poland regained independence and control of Łapy.

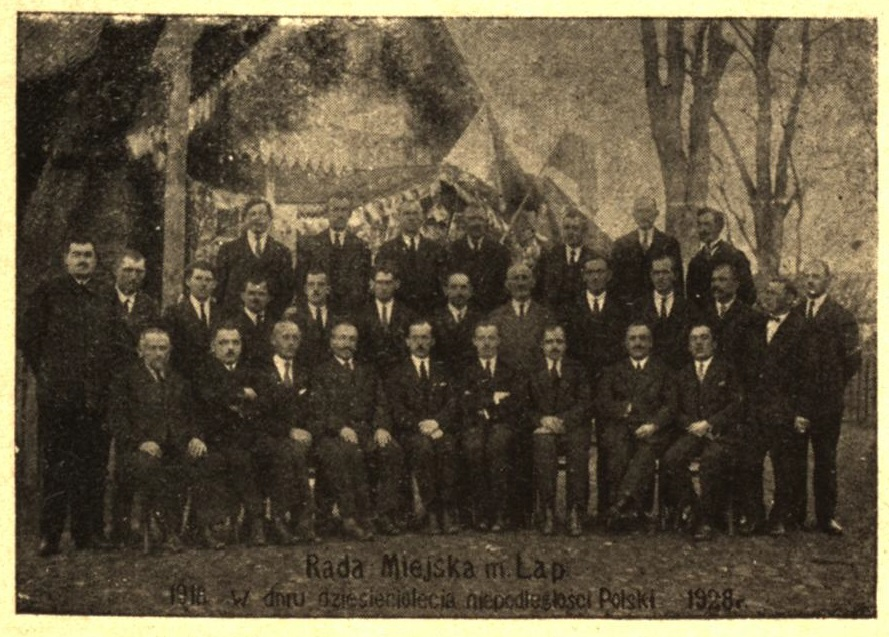
Town council of Łapy in 1928

The repair works exist today as 'ZNTK Łapy S.A.' They played a decisive role in Łapy's urbanization, the town charter granted on 1 January 1925.

=== World War II ===
At the eve of the German-Soviet invasion of Poland, which started World War II in 1939, the town population reached 8,000 citizens. Following the invasion, Łapy was first occupied by the Soviet Union until 1941, and then by Germany until 1944, when it was finally restored to Poland. The Polish resistance movement was present in Łapy, and its activities included sabotage at the railway repair works. During the war, the town was 80% destroyed, and the entire local Jewish population was murdered by the German occupiers in the Holocaust.

On Sunday, July 30, 1944, the Wehrmacht set Uhowo on fire. They also blew up the bridges over the Narew River. On July 31, they began destroying the city. Factory halls were blown up and the town was burning. The population hid in shelters and the church and Soviet planes shelled the church tower and German infantry positions near the cemetery on daily basis. On August 6, in the early morning hours, they launched a general assault. At around 11 in the morning, Soviet patrols entered the burning city. Following the end of the war the town became part of Białystok Voivodeship.

== Transport ==
=== Roads ===
There are two voivodeship roads crossing the town:

- DW 681 Roszki-Wodźki – Łapy – Brańsk – Ciechanowiec
- DW 682 Łapy – Markowszczyzna

Furthermore, the S 8 express-way runs to the north.

=== Railway ===
There are two railway routes going through the town:

- Saint Petersburg–Warsaw Railway (Białystok – Warsaw)
- Łapy – Ostrołęka (partly out of order)

Łapy hosts a railway station for all kinds of trains, which is situated in the town centre; and a railway stop Łapy Osse for slow trains only, in the Osse quarter, 3 km (2 miles) from the centre.

Łapy's railway destinations are numerous: Bielsko-Biała, Warsaw, Suwałki, Białystok, Wrocław, Opole, Częstochowa, Kraków, Szczecin, Poznań.

=== Bus services ===
There are many small PKS bus stops and the main one – Łapy, next to the railway station building in the centre, from which local lines operate in the directions of Białystok, Zambrów, Siemiatycze, Bielsk Podlaski, etc.

=== Bike and foot trails ===
- Red bike trail; the ring route of Narew National Park

Choroszcz – Zawady – Baciuty – Dobrowoda – Turośń Dolna – Borowskie Michały – Suraż – Łapy – Płonka Kościelna – Stara Łupianka – Jeńki – Waniewo – Kurowo – Stare Jeżewo – Tykocin – Choroszcz

- Red foot trail of Włodzimierz Puchalski – 36 km

Łapy Osse – Gąsówka-Osse – Płonka Kościelna – Płonka-Strumianka – Stara Łupianka – Bokiny – Jeńki – Waniewo – Kurowo – Stare Jeżewo

- Railwaymen's green foot trail

Łapy Osse – Grochy – Turek – Pietkowo – Suraż

== Demographics ==
Historical population

Year	Pop.	±%
1910	3,940	—
1921	3,495	−11.3%
1931	6,674	+91.0%
1939	7,250	+8.6%

Year	Pop.	±%
1950	6,052	−16.5%
1960	7,620	+25.9%
2010	16,049	+110.6%

== Economy ==
Until 2009, Łapy's economy was mainly based on the then functioning:

- sugar refinery, being one of the best in Poland and selling its sugar to inter alia Islamic countries and to the Middle East;
- and Railway Fleet Repair Works.

Unfortunately for the town, both of the works have been closed.

There are plans to create a subzone of Tarnobrzeg Special Economic Zone. A corresponding bill has been submitted at The Cabinet.

The development of industrial economy in Łapy and its neighbourhood is hindered first of all by the close proximity of Narew National Park. On the other hand, the town has a potential for the tourism industry.

== Sights ==
=== Historical buildings ===
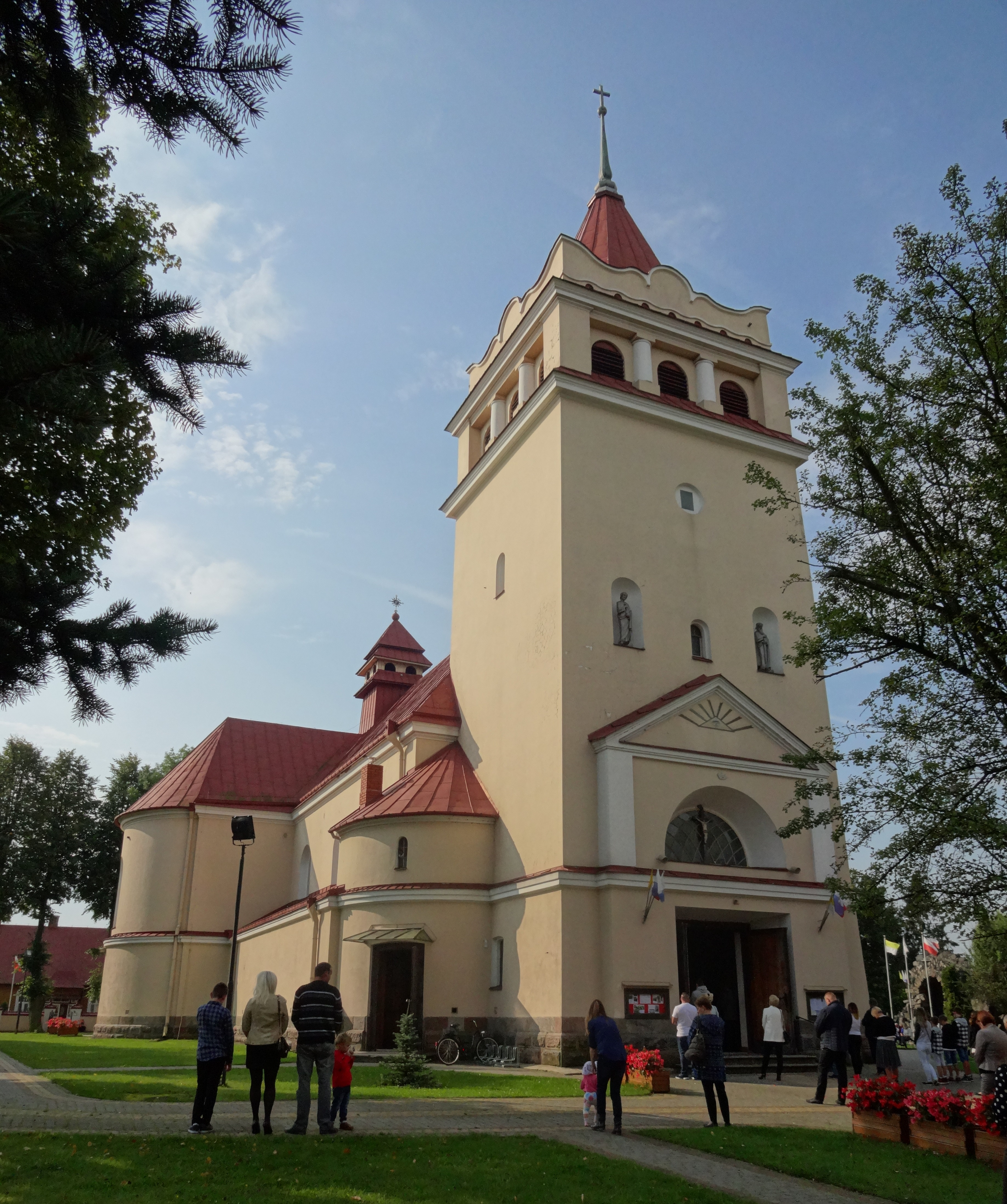
St. Peter and Paul's church

- St. Archangel Michael's parish church complex in Płonka Kościelna:
  - 1800 wooden chapel
  - c. 1905 brick church
  - c. 1905 fence and brick gate
- Water tower in the complex of the railway station, built at the beginning of the 20th century
- 1920s Etkun's House in Spółdzielcza Street
- St. Peter and Paul's parish church complex:
  - 1920-27 brick gate
  - c. 1929 wooden presbytery
  - c. 1930 brick vicarage
  - 1920 chapel
- St. Adalbert's parish church complex in Uhowo
- Four wooden houses built in 1924 in the railwaymen's settlement Wygwizdowo
- 27 brick houses built in the 1930s in the railwaymen's settlement Osse
- Block group in Sikorskiego St. and Spółdzielcza St.
- Market square

=== Memorials ===
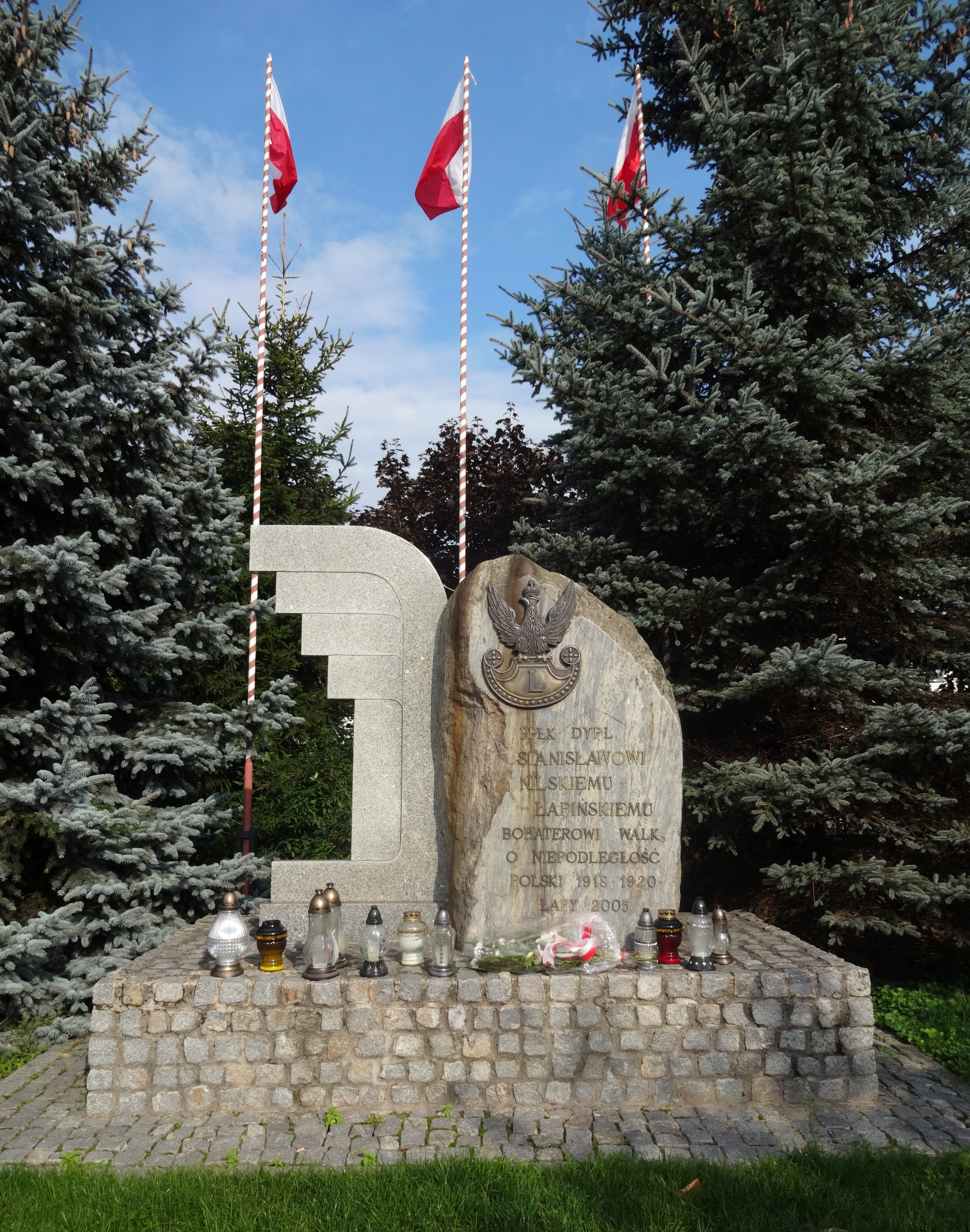
Memorials to Lieutenant colonel Stanisław Nilski-Łapiński and local Poles deported by the Soviets during World War II
- Memorial stone dedicated to Lieutenant colonel Stanisław Nilski-Łapiński
- Statue of Heroic Polish Children, dedicated to the children killed during the World War II
- Memorial to local victims of Nazi German occupation during World War II
- Memorial to local Poles deported by the Soviets to the USSR during World War II
- Statue of John III Sobieski in the nearby village Płonka Kościelna

=== Graveyards ===
- Historical church graveyard in Płonka Kościelna
- Roman Catholic graveyard in Płonka Kościelna
- Orthodox graveyard in Osse
- Roman Catholic graveyard in Uhowo
- Jewish cemetery in Łapy

=== Nature ===
- Narew National Park
- Bike and foot trails

== Cuisine ==
The officially protected traditional food of Łapy (as designated by the Ministry of Agriculture and Rural Development of Poland) is the klinek z Łap, a local type of traditionally produced quark.

== Sport clubs and organisations ==
- Pogoń Łapy, the town's main football club
- UKS Olimp LO Łapy
- UKS Łapa Łapy

== Cultural organizations and associations ==
- Łapskie Towarzystwo Regionalne

== Education ==
=== Kindergartens ===
- Council Kindergarten nr 1, ul. Polna 27
- Council Kindergarten nr 2, ul. Cmentarna 23

=== Primary schools ===
- Primary school, ul. Jana Matejki 10 (managed by 'Edukator' association from Łomża)
- Primary school nr 1, ul. Polna 9
- Primary school nr 2, ul. Piękna 17
- Primary school nr 3, ul. Letnia 1

=== High schools ===
- High School nr 1, ul. Bohaterów Westerplatte 10
- Vocational High Schools of Mechanics' Group, ul. Władysława Sikorskiego 68
  - Vocational High School
  - Basic Vocational School
  - High School nr 2
  - Specialised High School nr 2
  - Postgraduate School
  - High School for Adults
  - High School for Adult Remedial Education
  - Postgraduate School (extramural)

== Prominent people ==
- Józef Kosacki (1909–1990), Polish engineer, inventor, officer, who invented the first mine detector. His device was a significant contribution to the Allies' victory in World War II.
- Waldemar Kikolski (1967–2001), Polish paralympic athlete born in Łapy

== History literature concerning Łapy ==
- Bitwy i potyczki 1863-1864, oprac. Stanisław Zieliński, Raperswil 1913.
- Rocznik Statystyczny Królestwa Polskiego za 1913, Warsaw 1914.
- Skorowidz miejscowości Rzeczypospolitej Polskiej z oznaczeniem terytorialnie im właściwych władz i urzędów oraz urządzeń komunikacyjnych; WWarsaw-Przemyśl 1933.
- Słownik geograficzny Królestwa Polskiego i innych krajów słowiańskich, Warsaw 1887.
- Księga adresowa Polski (wraz z W.M. Gdańskiem) dla handlu, przemysłu, rzemiosł i rolnictwa na 1930 r., Warsaw 1930.
- J. Beszta Borowski, Pół wieku zarazy 1944-200. Moje zapiski faktów i refleksji, Komorów 2002.
- S. Chankowski, Powstanie styczniowe w Augustowskiem, Warsaw 1972.
- A. Dobroński, Infrastruktura społeczna i ekonomiczna guberni łomżyńskiej i obwodu białostockiego (1866–1914), Rozprawy Uniwersytetu Warszawskiego, 197, Białystok 1979.
- Ł. Lubicz-Łapiński, Łapy i ich mieszkańcy. Zaścianki Łapińskich w XV-XVIII w., Białystok 2004.
- S. Łaniec, Partyzanci żelaznych dróg w roku 1863, Warsaw 1974.
- M. Olechnowicz, Z przeszłości Łap i okolic, z. 1, Łapy 1999.
- J. Szumski, Łapy w latach 1862-1914, Białostocczyzna”, nr 1, 1997.
- P. Sobieszczak, Poświętne wczoraj i dziś. Rys historyczny parafii i gminy do końca XX wieku., Łapy 2008.
