= Olszewo, Gmina Brańsk =

Olszewo
- Village
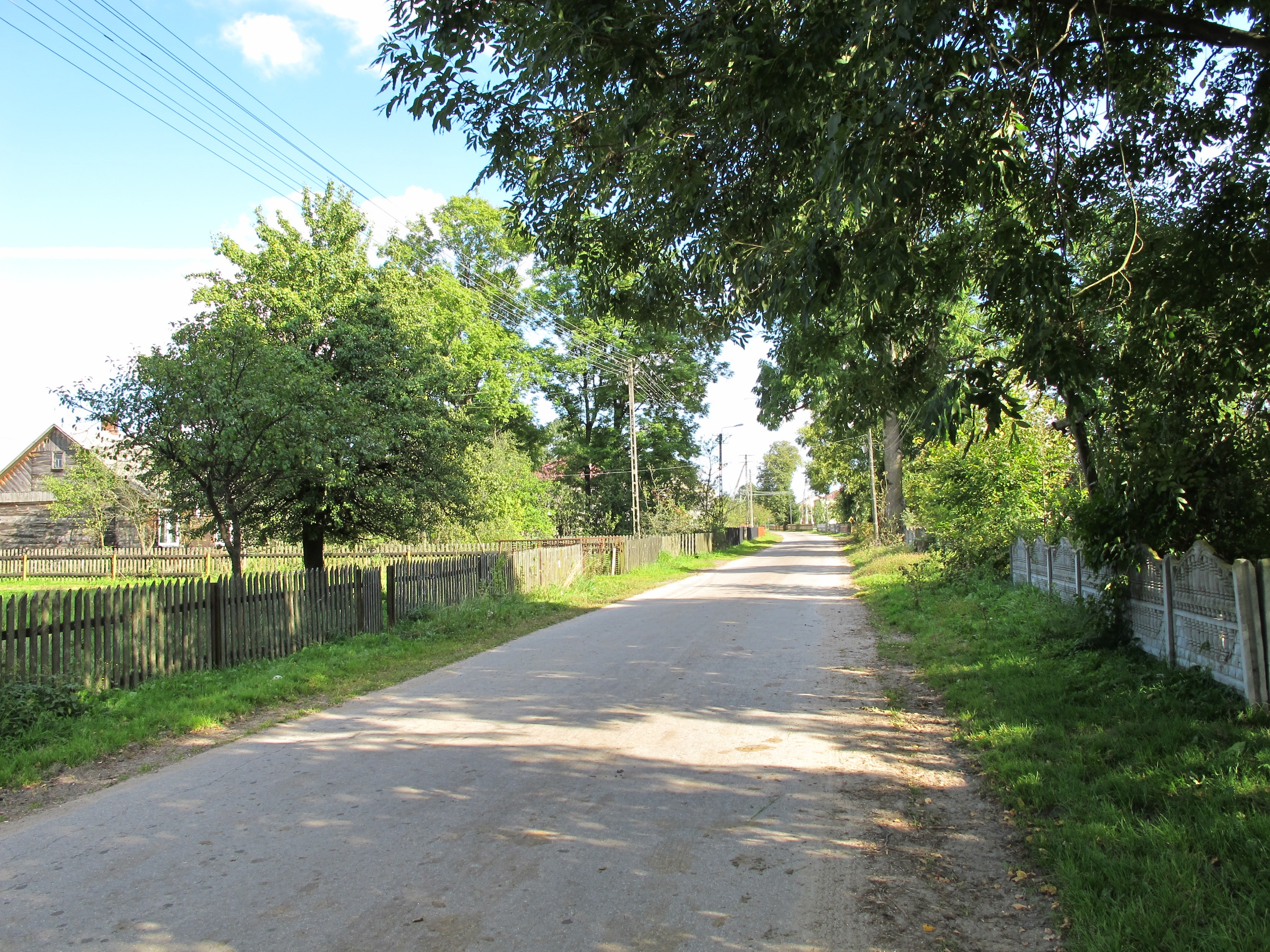
- Road in Olsewo

- Location within Poland
- Coordinates: 52°41′28″N 23°01′34″E
- Country: Poland
- Voivodeship: Podlaskie
- County: Bielsk
- Gmina: Brańsk
- Time zone: UTC+1 (CET)
  - Summer (DST): UTC+2 (CEST)
- Vehicle registration: BBI

Olszewo [ɔlˈʂɛvɔ] is a village in the administrative district of Gmina Brańsk, within Bielsk County, Podlaskie Voivodeship, in eastern Poland.

== Massacre during World War II ==
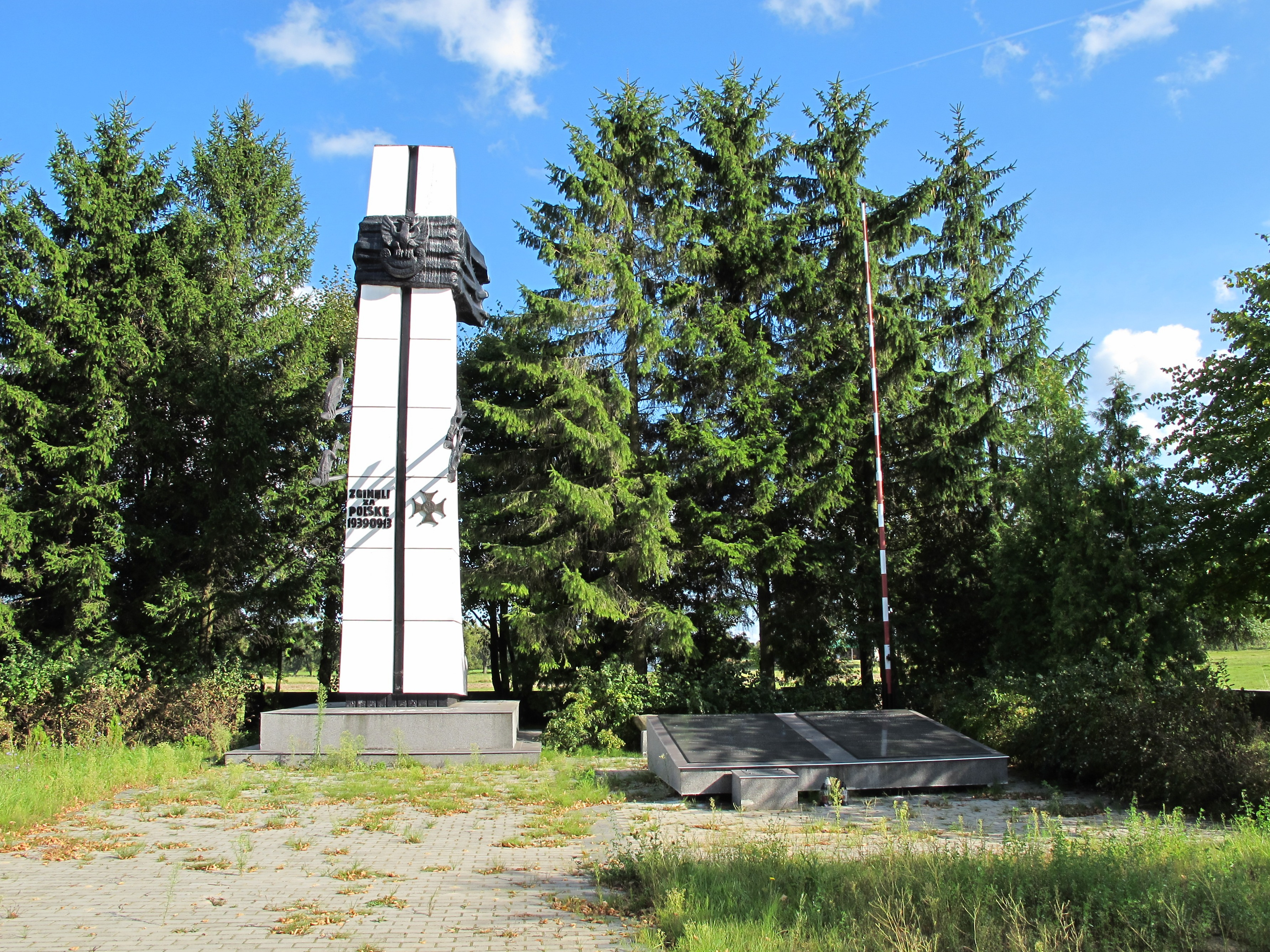
Memorial to the victims of the battle and massacre

During the German invasion of Poland at the start of World War II, on 13–14 September 1939, it was the site of a battle between the Polish Suwalska Cavalry Brigade and German 206th Infantry Division. On 14 September 1939, in reprisal for German losses, German troops carried out a massacre of thirteen people (half of the villagers) from Olszewo, ten civilians from the nearby villages of Pietkowo, Gabrysin, Marynki, and 30 Polish prisoners of war (see Nazi crimes against the Polish nation).

They were murdered in several ways, such as stabbing by bayonets, shooting, being torn apart by grenades, and being burned alive in a barn.

=== Victims of the Massacre ===
The victims included Poles and Ukrainians, one woman and a priest.

Villagers from Olszewo:

- Wiktoria Borowska, female, age 30
- Teofil Borowski, male, age 36
- Emil Olendzki, male, age 62
- Piotr Olendski, male, age 60
- Jozef Olendzki, male, age 24
- Wiktor Olszewski, male, age 45
- Piotr Olszewski, male, age 40
- Antoni Poniatowski, male, age 18
- Aleksander Spalinski, male
- Boleslaw Szerakowski, male, age 48
- Aleksander Szerakowski, male, age 48
- Karol Zakrzewski, male, age 60
- Wincenty Zdrojkowski, male, age 30

Villagers from Pietkowo, Gabrysin and Marynki:

- Kazimerz Dabrowski, male, age 21
- Bronislaw Grabowski, female, age 45
- Kazimerz Kielkucki, male, age 25
- Bronislaw Kowalewski, female, age 38
- Andrezej Osmolski, male, age 36
- Jozef Osmolski, male, age 34
- Stanislaw Sienkiewicz, male, age 40
- Stanislaw Sienko, male, age 18
- Jozef Wojcik, male, age 40
- Jerzy Zakrzewski, male, age 45
