= Stoczek =

Stoczek may refer to:

- Stoczek Łukowski in Lublin Voivodeship (east Poland)
- Stoczek, Białystok County in Podlaskie Voivodeship (north-east Poland)
- Stoczek, Grajewo County in Podlaskie Voivodeship (north-east Poland)
- Stoczek, Hajnówka County in Podlaskie Voivodeship (north-east Poland)
- Stoczek, Mońki County in Podlaskie Voivodeship (north-east Poland)
- Stoczek, Lublin County in Lublin Voivodeship (east Poland)
- Stoczek, Radzyń County in Lublin Voivodeship (east Poland)
- Stoczek, Garwolin County in Masovian Voivodeship (east-central Poland)
- Stoczek, Węgrów County in Masovian Voivodeship (east-central Poland)
- Stoczek, Warmian-Masurian Voivodeship (north-east Poland)
- Stoczek Klasztorny in the Warmian-Masurian Voivodeship (north-east Poland)
