= Barwiki (Łapy) =

Łapy-Barwiki
- Village
- Barwiki (Łapy)
- Location within Poland
- Coordinates: 52°59′N 22°52′E
- Country: Poland
- Voivodeship: Podlaskie
- County: Białystok
- Gmina: Łapy

Barwiki [barviki] (formerly Łapy-Barwiki) is a village in the administrative district of Gmina Łapy, within Białystok County, Podlaskie Voivodeship, in north-eastern Poland.

Until the end of 1924, it was an independent village in the Poświętne commune in Wysokie Mazowieckie County, and from 1919 in the Białystok Voivodeship. On January 1, 1925, it was incorporated into the newly created city of Łapy
