= Stara Gąsówka =

- Village
- Location within Poland
- Coordinates: 53°00′30″N 22°47′30″E
- Country: Poland
- Voivodeship: Podlaskie
- County: Białystok
- Gmina: Łapy

Stara Gąsówka [ˈstara ɡɔ̃ˈsufka] is a village in the administrative district of Gmina Łapy, within Białystok County, Podlaskie Voivodeship, in north-eastern Poland.
