= Kamińskie Wiktory =

- Village
- Location within Poland
- Coordinates: 52°56′44″N 22°49′56″E
- Country: Poland
- Voivodeship: Podlaskie
- County: Białystok
- Gmina: Poświętne

Kamińskie Wiktory [kaˈmiɲskʲɛ vikˈtɔrɨ] is a village in the administrative district of Gmina Poświętne, within Białystok County, Podlaskie Voivodeship, in north-eastern Poland.
