= Daniłowo Duże =

- Village
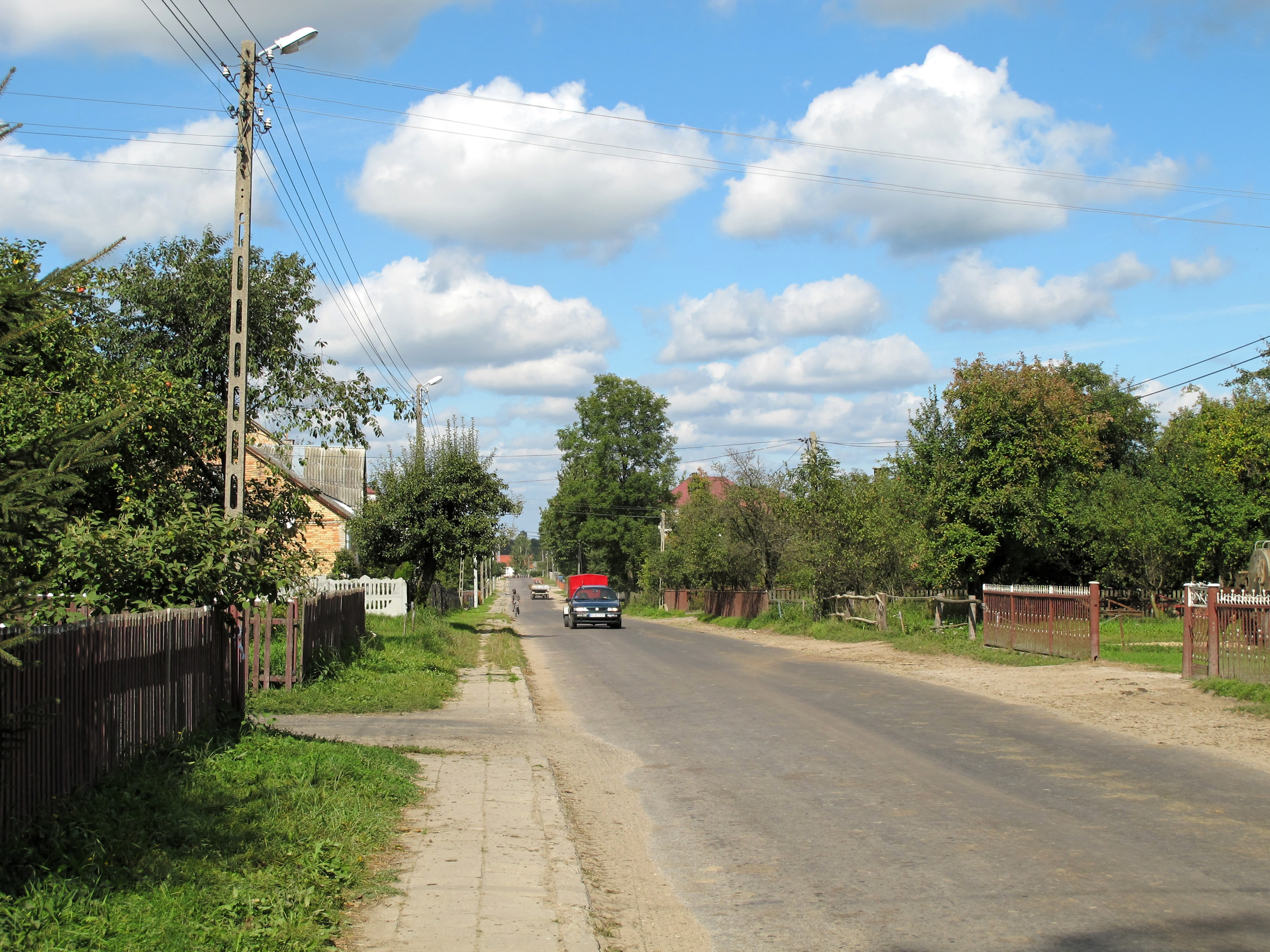

- Location within Poland
- Coordinates: 52°56′N 22°53′E
- Country: Poland
- Voivodeship: Podlaskie
- County: Białystok
- Gmina: Łapy
- Population: 250

Daniłowo Duże [daniˈwɔvɔ ˈduʐɛ] is a village in the administrative district of Gmina Łapy, within Białystok County, Podlaskie Voivodeship, in north-eastern Poland.
