= Gąsówka-Somachy =

- Village
- Location within Poland
- Coordinates: 52°57′25″N 22°53′35″E
- Country: Poland
- Voivodeship: Podlaskie
- County: Białystok
- Gmina: Łapy

Gąsówka-Somachy [ɡɔ̃ˈsufka sɔˈmaxɨ] is a village in the administrative district of Gmina Łapy, within Białystok County, Podlaskie Voivodeship, in north-eastern Poland.
