= Gąsówka-Skwarki =

Village in Gmina Łapy, Poland

- Village
- Location within Poland
- Coordinates: 52°57′15″N 22°53′45″E
- Country: Poland
- Voivodeship: Podlaskie
- County: Białystok
- Gmina: Łapy

Gąsówka-Skwarki [ɡɔ̃ˈsufka ˈskfarki] is a village in the administrative district of Gmina Łapy, within Białystok County, Podlaskie Voivodeship, in north-eastern Poland.
