= Kamińskie Ocioski =

- Village
- Location within Poland
- Coordinates: 52°57′N 22°48′E
- Country: Poland
- Voivodeship: Podlaskie
- County: Białystok
- Gmina: Poświętne

Kamińskie Ocioski [kaˈmiɲskʲɛ ɔˈt͡ɕɔski] is a village in the administrative district of Gmina Poświętne, within Białystok County, Podlaskie Voivodeship, in north-eastern Poland.
