= Brzozowo-Chabdy =

- Village
- Location within Poland
- Coordinates: 52°54′55″N 22°47′15″E
- Country: Poland
- Voivodeship: Podlaskie
- County: Białystok
- Gmina: Poświętne

Brzozowo-Chabdy [bʐɔˈzɔvɔ ˈxabdɨ] is a village in the administrative district of Gmina Poświętne, within Białystok County, Podlaskie Voivodeship, in north-eastern Poland.
