= Dzierżki-Ząbki =

Village in Gmina Poświętne, Poland

- Village
- Location within Poland
- Coordinates: 52°54′34″N 22°49′35″E
- Country: Poland
- Voivodeship: Podlaskie
- County: Białystok
- Gmina: Poświętne

Dzierżki-Ząbki [ˈd͡ʑɛrʂki ˈzɔmpki] is a village in the administrative district of Gmina Poświętne, within Białystok County, Podlaskie Voivodeship, in north-eastern Poland.
