= Roszki-Włodki =

- Village
- Location within Poland
- Coordinates: 53°0′N 22°47′E
- Country: Poland
- Voivodeship: Podlaskie
- County: Białystok
- Gmina: Łapy
- Population: 80

Roszki-Włodki [ˈrɔʂki ˈvwɔtki] is a village in the administrative district of Gmina Łapy, within Białystok County, Podlaskie Voivodeship, in north-eastern Poland.
