= Nowa Łupianka =

- Village
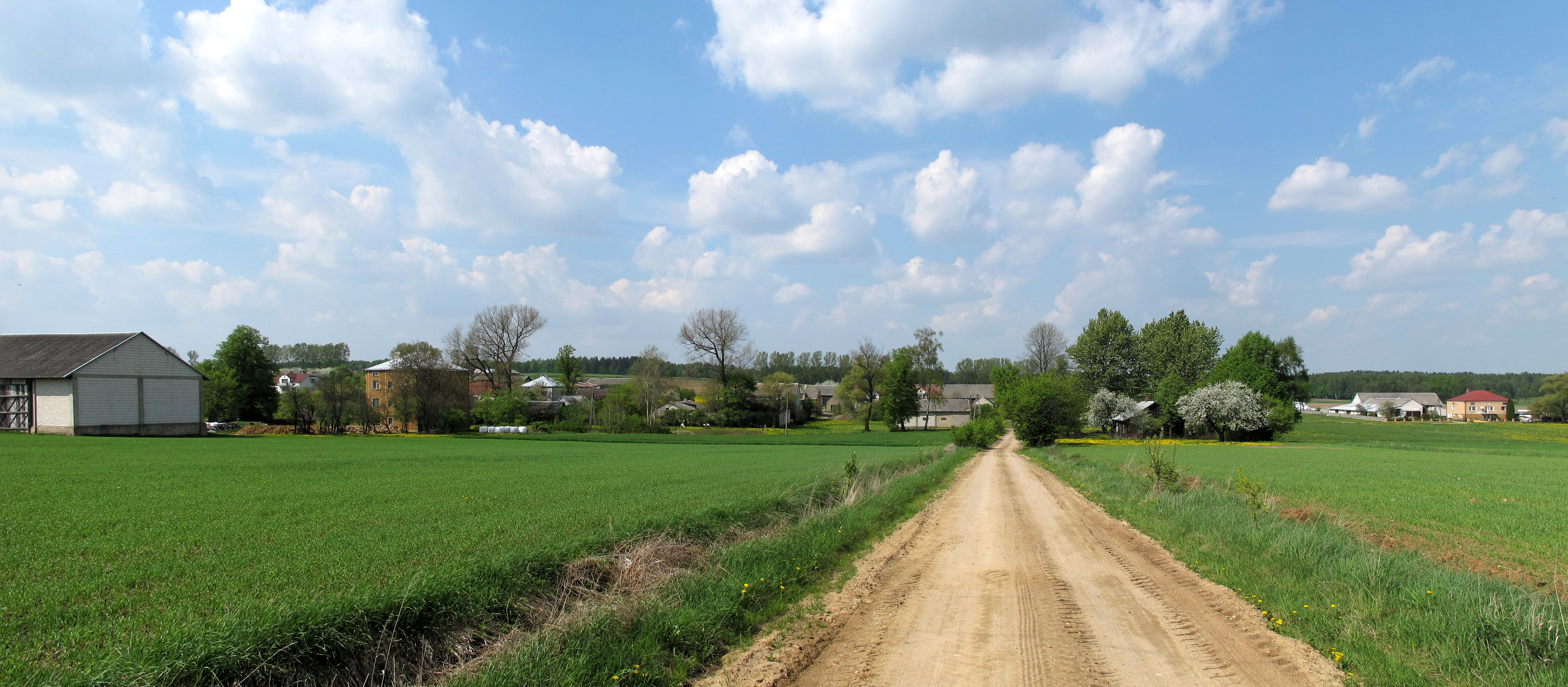
- View from the fields in Nowa Łupianka

- Location within Poland
- Coordinates: 53°01′31″N 22°48′44″E
- Country: Poland
- Voivodeship: Podlaskie
- County: Białystok
- Gmina: Łapy

Nowa Łupianka [ˈnɔva wuˈpjaŋka] is a village in the administrative district of Gmina Łapy, within Białystok County, Podlaskie Voivodeship, in north-eastern Poland.
