= Porośl-Głuchy =

- Village
- Location within Poland
- Coordinates: 52°55′42″N 22°43′28″E
- Country: Poland
- Voivodeship: Podlaskie
- County: Białystok
- Gmina: Poświętne

Porośl-Głuchy [ˈpɔrɔɕl ˈɡwuxɨ] is a village in the administrative district of Gmina Poświętne, within Białystok County, Podlaskie Voivodeship, in north-eastern Poland.
