= Kuran, Poland =

Kuran
- Village
- Location within Poland
- Coordinates: 52°56′04″N 22°49′06″E
- Country: Poland
- Voivodeship: Podlaskie
- County: Białystok
- Gmina: Poświętne

Kuran [ˈkuran] is a village in the administrative district of Gmina Poświętne, within Białystok County, Podlaskie Voivodeship, in north-eastern Poland.
