= Daniłowo Małe =

- Village
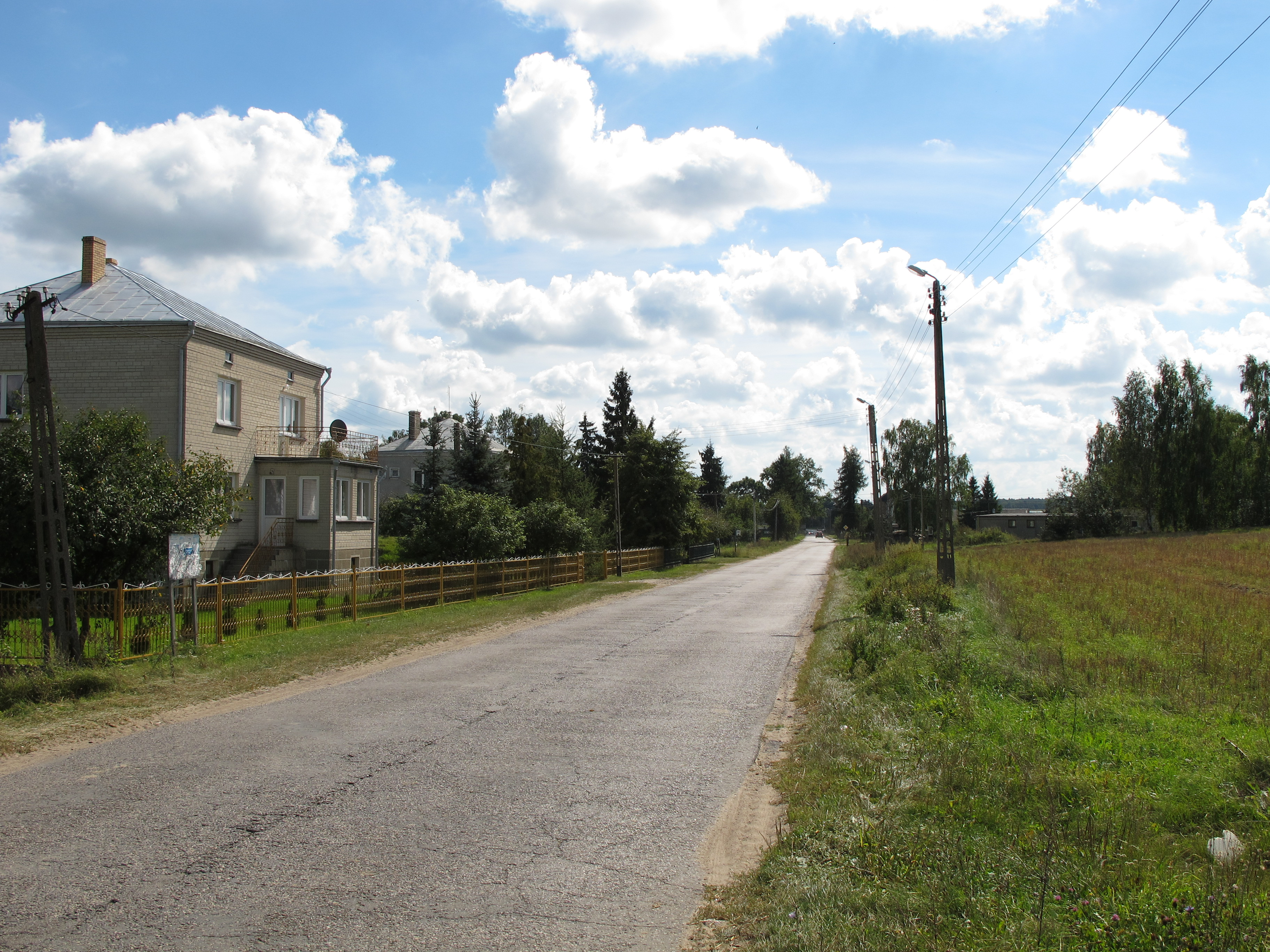

- Location within Poland
- Coordinates: 52°57′N 22°53′E
- Country: Poland
- Voivodeship: Podlaskie
- County: Białystok
- Gmina: Łapy

Daniłowo Małe [daniˈwɔvɔ ˈmawɛ] is a village in the administrative district of Gmina Łapy, within Białystok County, Podlaskie Voivodeship, in north-eastern Poland.
