= Łukawica, Podlaskie Voivodeship =

Łukawica
- Village
- Location within Poland
- Coordinates: 52°52′19″N 22°50′47″E
- Country: Poland
- Voivodeship: Podlaskie
- County: Białystok
- Gmina: Poświętne
- Time zone: UTC+1 (CET)
  - Summer (DST): UTC+2 (CEST)
- Vehicle registration: BIA

Łukawica [wukaˈvit͡sa] is a village in the administrative district of Gmina Poświętne, within Białystok County, Podlaskie Voivodeship, in north-eastern Poland.

During the January Uprising, on September 19, 1863, the Battle of Łukawica was fought between Polish insurgents and Russian troops. After the battle, as punishment for supporting the uprising, the Russians plundered the village, and expelled its entire population, which was forcibly marched to the nearby town of Bielsk Podlaski, and then deported to katorga in Siberia. Two people died during the march from Łukawica to Bielsk: an old man and a child.
