= Gąsówka-Oleksin =

Village in Gmina Łapy, Poland

- Village
- Location within Poland
- Coordinates: 52°57′30″N 22°53′30″E
- Country: Poland
- Voivodeship: Podlaskie
- County: Białystok
- Gmina: Łapy
- Population: 170

Gąsówka-Oleksin [ɡɔ̃ˈsufka ɔˈlɛkɕin] is a village in the administrative district of Gmina Łapy, within Białystok County, Podlaskie Voivodeship, in north-eastern Poland.
