= Gmina Poświętne, Podlaskie Voivodeship =

Gmina Poświętne Poświętne Commune
- Gmina
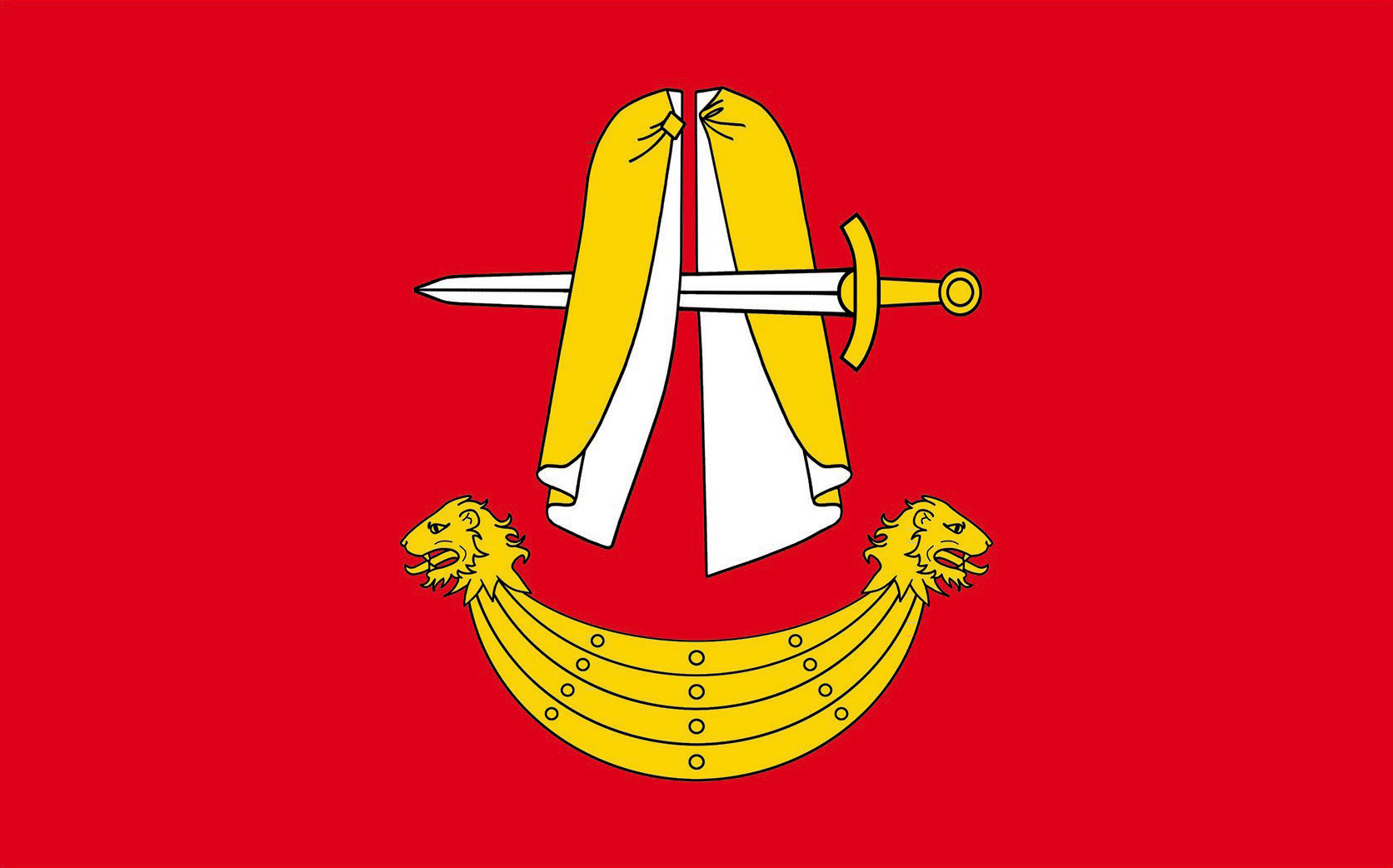
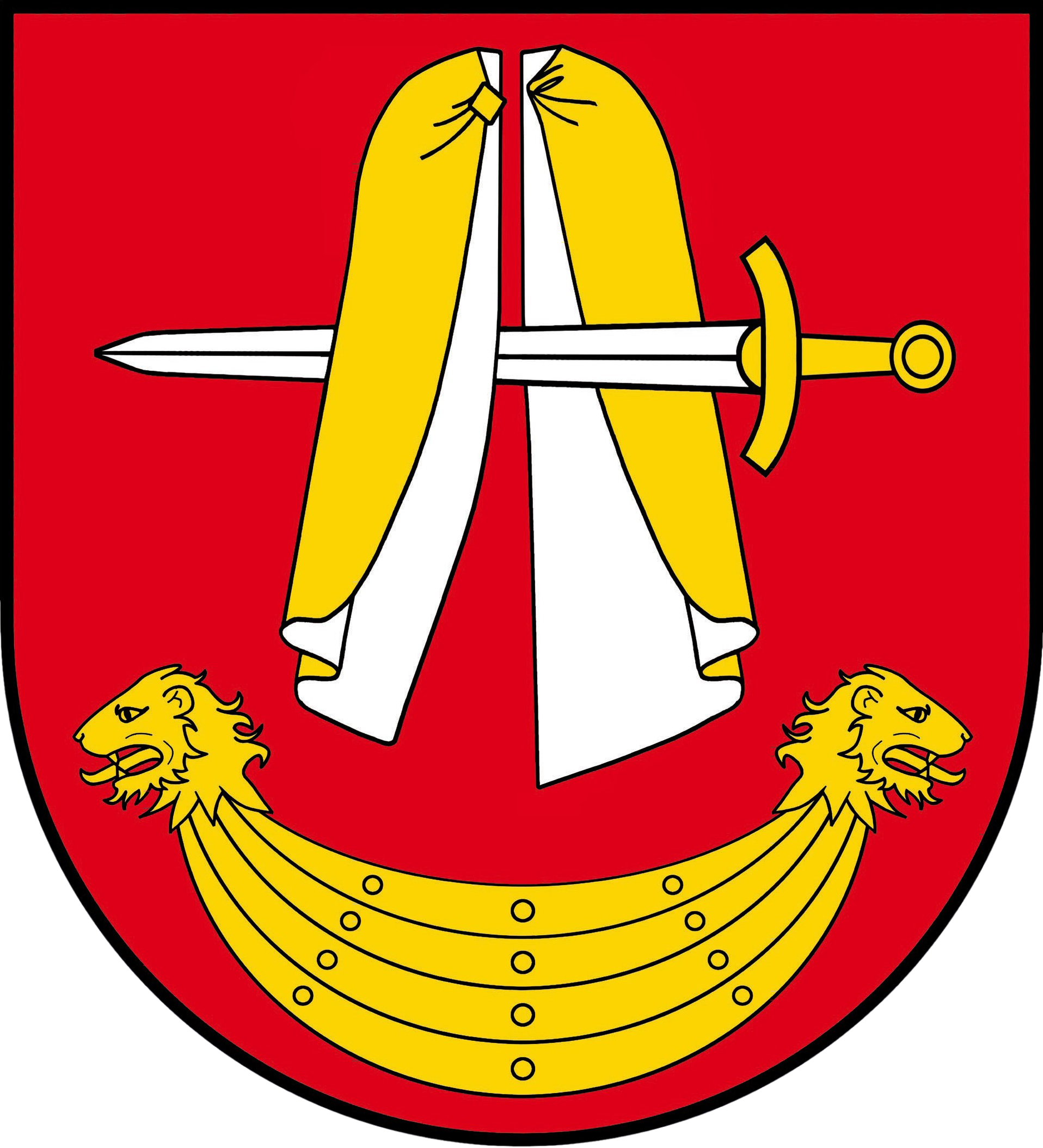
- Flag Coat of arms

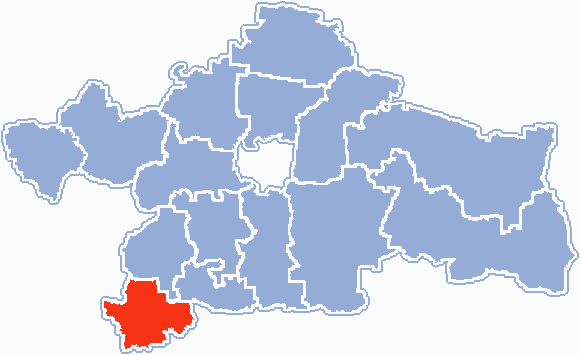
- Location within Białystok County
- Coordinates (Poświętne): 52°55′22″N 22°49′43″E
- Country: Poland
- Voivodeship: Podlaskie
- County: Białystok County
- Seat: Poświętne

Area
  - Total: 114.33 km^{2} (44.14 sq mi)

Population (2006)
  - Total: 3,761
  - Density: 32.90/km^{2} (85.20/sq mi)
- Website: http://gminaposwietne.free

Gmina Poświętne is a rural gmina (administrative district) in Białystok County, Podlaskie Voivodeship, in north-eastern Poland. Its seat is the village of Poświętne, which lies approximately 32 kilometres (20 mi) south-west of the regional capital Białystok.

The gmina covers an area of 114.33 square kilometres (44.1 sq mi), and as of 2006 its total population is 3,761.

== Villages ==
Gmina Poświętne contains the villages and settlements of Bielsk Podlaski, Brzozowo Stare, Brzozowo-Antonie, Brzozowo-Chabdy, Brzozowo-Chrzczonki, Brzozowo-Chrzczony, Brzozowo-Korabie, Brzozowo-Muzyły, Brzozowo-Panki, Brzozowo-Solniki, Chomizna, Dzierżki, Dzierżki-Ząbki, Gabrysin, Gołębie, Grochy, Józefin, Kamińskie Jaski, Kamińskie Ocioski, Kamińskie Pliszki, Kamińskie Wiktory, Kuran, Liza Nowa, Liza Stara, Łukawica, Marynki, Ostrów, Pietkowo, Pietkowo Drugie, Porośl-Głuchy, Porośl-Wojsławy, Stoczek, Turek, Wilkowo Nowe, Wilkowo Stare, Wołkuny, Zdrody Nowe and Zdrody Stare.

== Neighbouring gminas ==
Gmina Poświętne is bordered by the gminy of Brańsk, Łapy, Nowe Piekuty, Sokoły, Suraż and Wyszki.
