= Brzozowo-Solniki =

- Village
- Location within Poland
- Coordinates: 52°55′N 22°46′E
- Country: Poland
- Voivodeship: Podlaskie
- County: Białystok
- Gmina: Poświętne
- Population: 80

Brzozowo-Solniki [bʐɔˈzɔvɔ sɔlˈniki] is a village in the administrative district of Gmina Poświętne, within Białystok County, Podlaskie Voivodeship, in north-eastern Poland.
