= Liza Stara =

- Village
- Location within Poland
- Coordinates: 52°52′N 22°48′E
- Country: Poland
- Voivodeship: Podlaskie
- County: Białystok
- Gmina: Poświętne
- Population: 200

Liza Stara [ˈliza ˈstara] is a village in the administrative district of Gmina Poświętne, within Białystok County, Podlaskie Voivodeship, in north-eastern Poland.

According to the 1921 census, the village was inhabited by 295 people, among whom 293 were Roman Catholic, and 2 Mosaic. At the same time, 293 inhabitants declared Polish nationality, 2 Jewish. There were 44 residential buildings in the village.
