= Płonka-Kozły =

- Village
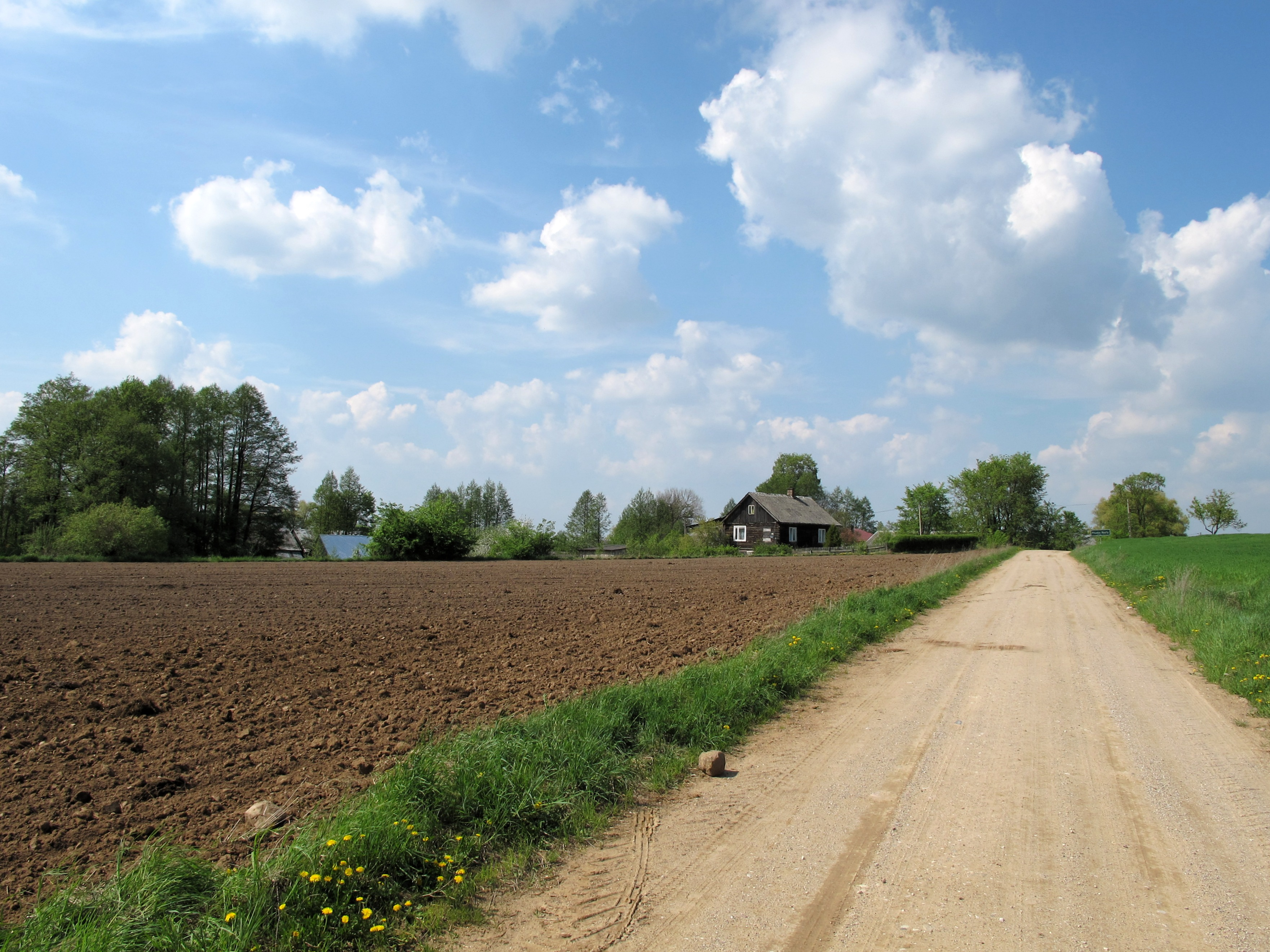
- View from an unpaved road in Płonka-Kozły

- Location within Poland
- Coordinates: 53°00′30″N 22°50′30″E
- Country: Poland
- Voivodeship: Podlaskie
- County: Białystok
- Gmina: Łapy

Płonka-Kozły [ˈpwɔŋka ˈkɔzwɨ] is a village in the administrative district of Gmina Łapy. It is within Białystok County, Podlaskie Voivodeship, in north-eastern Poland.
