= Wołkuny =

- Village
- Location within Poland
- Coordinates: 52°55′25″N 22°43′35″E
- Country: Poland
- Voivodeship: Podlaskie
- County: Białystok
- Gmina: Poświętne

Wołkuny [vɔu̯ˈkunɨ] is a village in the administrative district of Gmina Poświętne, within Białystok County, Podlaskie Voivodeship, in north-eastern Poland.
