= Płonka-Matyski =

Village in Gmina Łapy, Poland

- Village
- Location within Poland
- Coordinates: 53°00′45″N 22°50′15″E
- Country: Poland
- Voivodeship: Podlaskie
- County: Białystok
- Gmina: Łapy

Płonka-Matyski [ˈpwɔŋka maˈtɨski] is a village in the administrative district of Gmina Łapy, within Białystok County, Podlaskie Voivodeship, in north-eastern Poland.
