= Brzozowo-Muzyły =

Village in Gmina Poświętne, Poland

- Village
- Location within Poland
- Coordinates: 52°55′11″N 22°46′1″E
- Country: Poland
- Voivodeship: Podlaskie
- County: Białystok
- Gmina: Poświętne

Brzozowo-Muzyły [bʐɔˈzɔvɔ muˈzɨwɨ] is a village in the administrative district of Gmina Poświętne, within Białystok County, Podlaskie Voivodeship, in north-eastern Poland.
