= Łapy-Łynki =

Village in Gmina Łapy, Poland

- Village
- Location within Poland
- Coordinates: 52°58′33″N 22°51′52″E
- Country: Poland
- Voivodeship: Podlaskie
- County: Białystok
- Gmina: Łapy

Łapy-Łynki [ˈwapɨ ˈwɨnki] is a village in the administrative district of Gmina Łapy, within Białystok County, Podlaskie Voivodeship, in north-eastern Poland.
