= Dzierżki =

- Village
- Location within Poland
- Coordinates: 52°54′04″N 22°49′55″E
- Country: Poland
- Voivodeship: Podlaskie
- County: Białystok
- Gmina: Poświętne

Dzierżki [ˈd͡ʑɛrʂki] is a village in the administrative district of Gmina Poświętne, within Białystok County, Podlaskie Voivodeship, in northeastern Poland.
