= Wilkowo Nowe =

- Village
- Location within Poland
- Coordinates: 52°55′45″N 22°43′15″E
- Country: Poland
- Voivodeship: Podlaskie
- County: Białystok
- Gmina: Poświętne

Wilkowo Nowe [vilˈkɔvɔ ˈnɔvɛ] is a village in the administrative district of Gmina Poświętne, within Białystok County, Podlaskie Voivodeship, in north-eastern Poland.
