= Porośl-Wojsławy =

Village in Gmina Poświętne, Poland

- Village
- Location within Poland
- Coordinates: 52°55′19″N 22°43′05″E
- Country: Poland
- Voivodeship: Podlaskie
- County: Białystok
- Gmina: Poświętne

Porośl-Wojsławy [ˈpɔrɔɕl vɔi̯ˈswavɨ] is a village in the administrative district of Gmina Poświętne, within Białystok County, Podlaskie Voivodeship, in north-eastern Poland.
