= Brzozowo-Panki =

- Village
- Location within Poland
- Coordinates: 52°53′9″N 22°45′40″E
- Country: Poland
- Voivodeship: Podlaskie
- County: Białystok
- Gmina: Poświętne

Brzozowo-Panki [bʐɔˈzɔvɔ ˈpanki] is a village in the administrative district of Gmina Poświętne, within Białystok County, Podlaskie Voivodeship, in north-eastern Poland.
