= Wólka Waniewska =

- Village
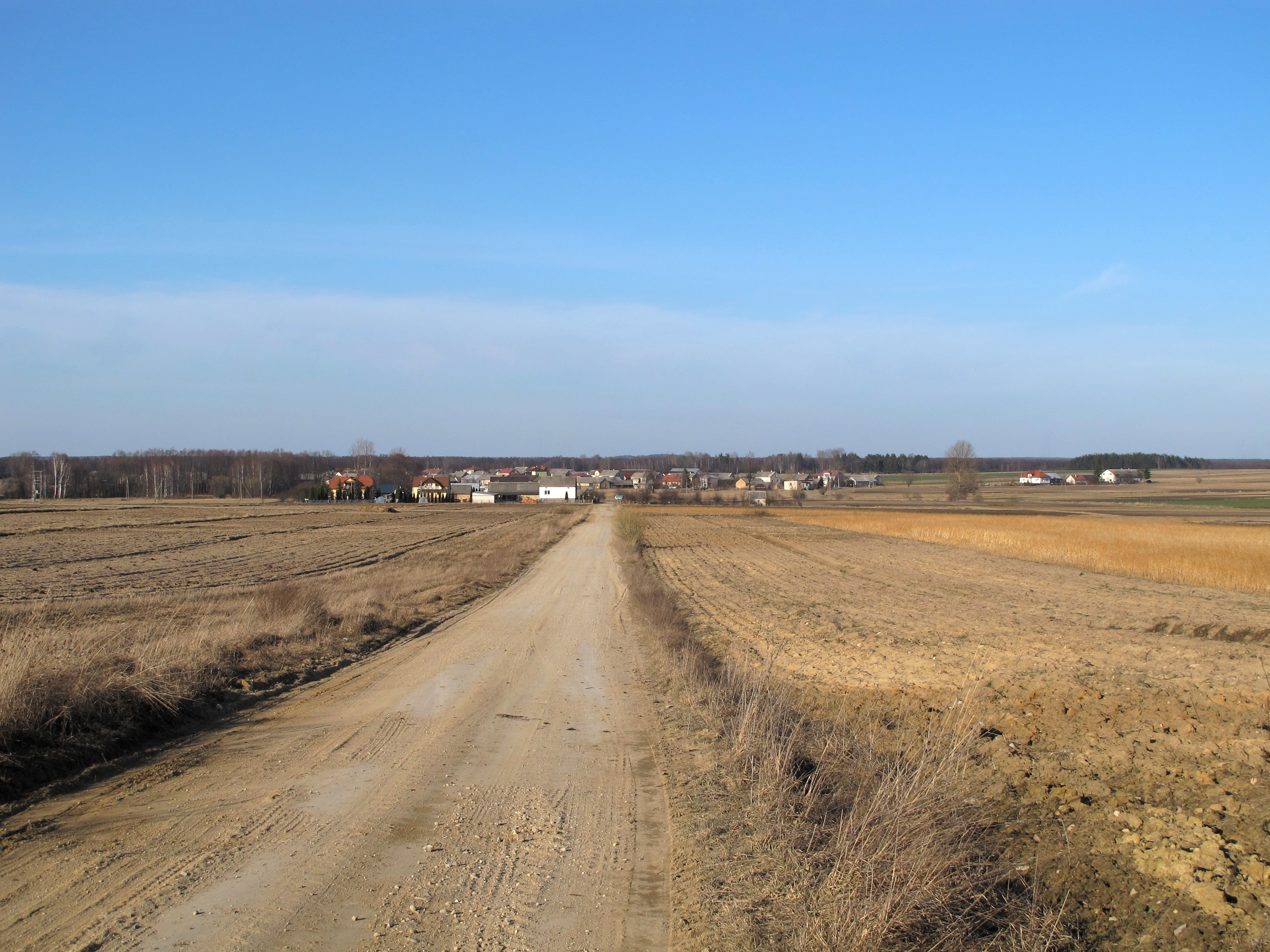
- Wólka Waniewska

- Location within Poland
- Coordinates: 53°01′30″N 22°55′30″E
- Country: Poland
- Voivodeship: Podlaskie
- County: Białystok
- Gmina: Łapy

Wólka Waniewska [ˈvulka vaˈɲɛfska] is a village in the administrative district of Gmina Łapy, within Białystok County, Podlaskie Voivodeship, in north-eastern Poland.
