= Łapy-Szołajdy =

Village in Gmina Łapy, Poland

- Village
- Location within Poland
- Coordinates: 52°58′44″N 22°54′13″E
- Country: Poland
- Voivodeship: Podlaskie
- County: Białystok
- Gmina: Łapy
- Population: 483

Łapy-Szołajdy [ˈwapɨ ʂɔˈwai̯dɨ] is a village in the administrative district of Gmina Łapy, within Białystok County, Podlaskie Voivodeship, in north-eastern Poland.
