= Gołębie, Podlaskie Voivodeship =

Gołębie
- Village
- Location within Poland
- Coordinates: 52°53′09″N 22°52′00″E
- Country: Poland
- Voivodeship: Podlaskie
- County: Białystok
- Gmina: Poświętne

Gołębie [ɡɔˈwɛmbjɛ] is a village in the administrative district of Gmina Poświętne, within Białystok County, Podlaskie Voivodeship, in north-eastern Poland.
