= Wilkowo Stare =

- Village
- Location within Poland
- Coordinates: 52°55′15″N 22°43′45″E
- Country: Poland
- Voivodeship: Podlaskie
- County: Białystok
- Gmina: Poświętne

Wilkowo Stare [vilˈkɔvɔ ˈstarɛ] is a village in the administrative district of Gmina Poświętne, within Białystok County, Podlaskie Voivodeship, in north-eastern Poland.
