= Gmina Łapy =

Gmina Łapy Łapy Commune
- Gmina
- Flag Coat of arms

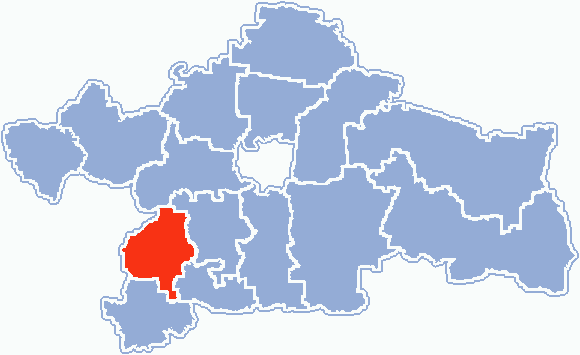
- Location within Białystok County
- Coordinates (Łapy): 52°59′N 22°53′E
- Country: Poland
- Voivodeship: Podlaskie
- County: Białystok County
- Seat: Łapy

Area
  - Total: 127.57 km^{2} (49.26 sq mi)

Population (2006)
  - Total: 23,132
  - Density: 181.33/km^{2} (469.64/sq mi)
  - Urban: 16,583
  - Rural: 6,549
- Website: http://www.lapy.podlasie.pl/

Gmina Łapy is an urban-rural gmina (administrative district) in Białystok County, Podlaskie Voivodeship, in north-eastern Poland. Its seat is the town of Łapy, which lies approximately 25 kilometres (16 mi) south-west of the regional capital Białystok.

The gmina covers an area of 127.57 square kilometres (49.3 sq mi), and as of 2006 its total population is 23,132 (out of which the population of Łapy amounts to 16,583, and the population of the rural part of the gmina is 6,549).

== Villages ==
Apart from the town of Łapy, Gmina Łapy contains the villages and settlements of Bokiny, Daniłowo Duże, Daniłowo Małe, Gąsówka-Oleksin, Gąsówka-Osse, Gąsówka-Skwarki, Gąsówka-Somachy, Łapy-Dębowina, Łapy-Kołpaki, Łapy-Korczaki, Łapy-Łynki, Łapy-Pluśniaki, Łapy-Szołajdy, Nowa Łupianka, Płonka Kościelna, Płonka-Kozły, Płonka-Matyski, Płonka-Strumianka, Roszki-Włodki, Roszki-Wodźki, Stara Gąsówka, Stara Łupianka, Uhowo and Wólka Waniewska.

== Neighbouring gminas ==
Gmina Łapy is bordered by the gminas of Choroszcz, Poświętne, Sokoły, Suraż and Turośń Kościelna.
