= Jeńki =

- Village
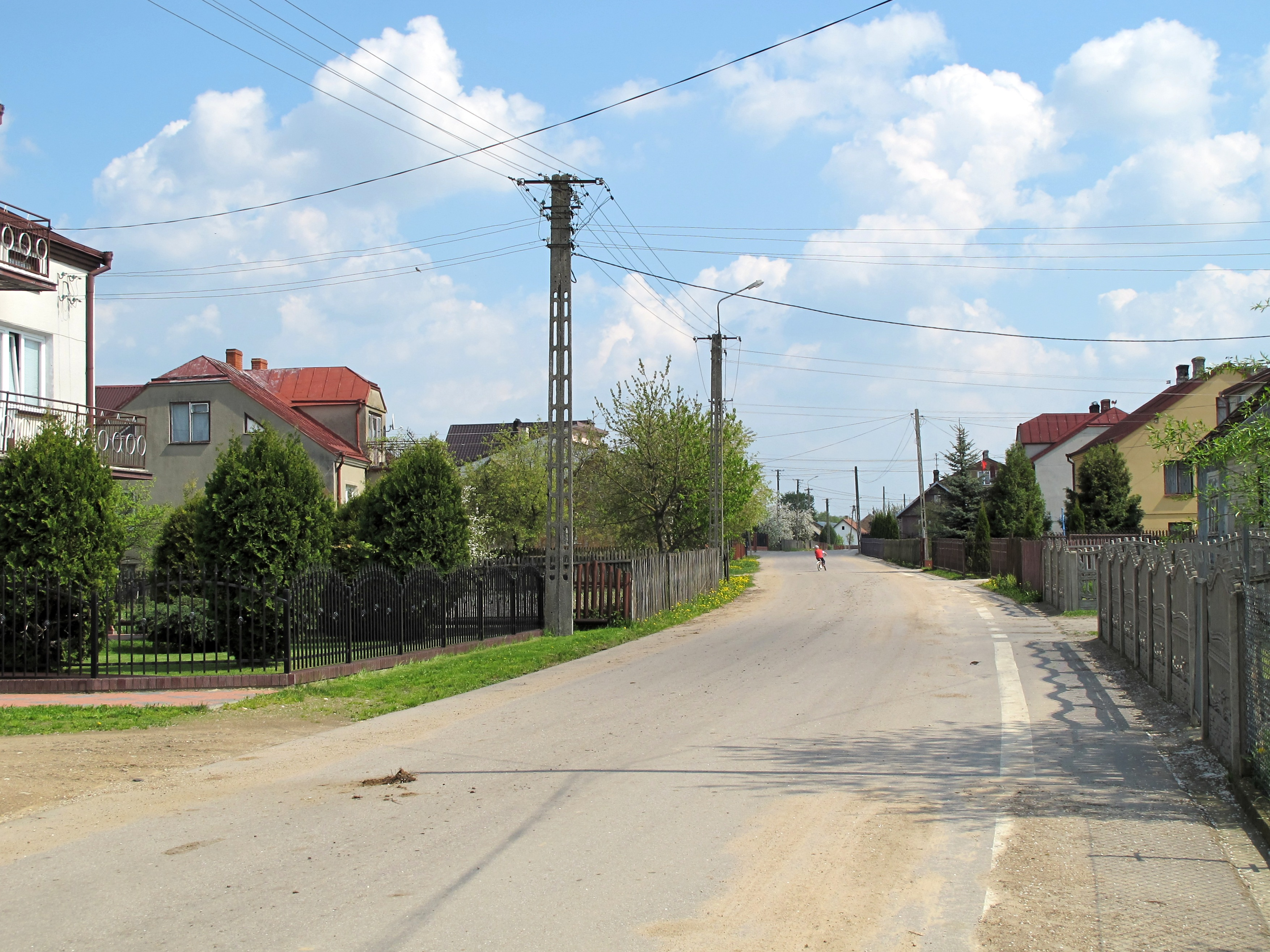

- Location within Poland
- Coordinates: 53°3′N 22°49′E
- Country: Poland
- Voivodeship: Podlaskie
- County: Wysokie Mazowieckie
- Gmina: Sokoły

Jeńki [ˈjɛɲki] is a village in the administrative district of Gmina Sokoły, within Wysokie Mazowieckie County, Podlaskie Voivodeship, in north-eastern Poland.
