= Łapy-Korczaki =

Village in Gmina Łapy, Poland

- Village
- Location within Poland
- Coordinates: 52°57′32″N 22°53′08″E
- Country: Poland
- Voivodeship: Podlaskie
- County: Białystok
- Gmina: Łapy

Łapy-Korczaki [ˈwapɨ kɔrˈt͡ʂaki] is a village in the administrative district of Gmina Łapy, within Białystok County, Podlaskie Voivodeship, in north-eastern Poland.
