= Płonka Kościelna =

- Village
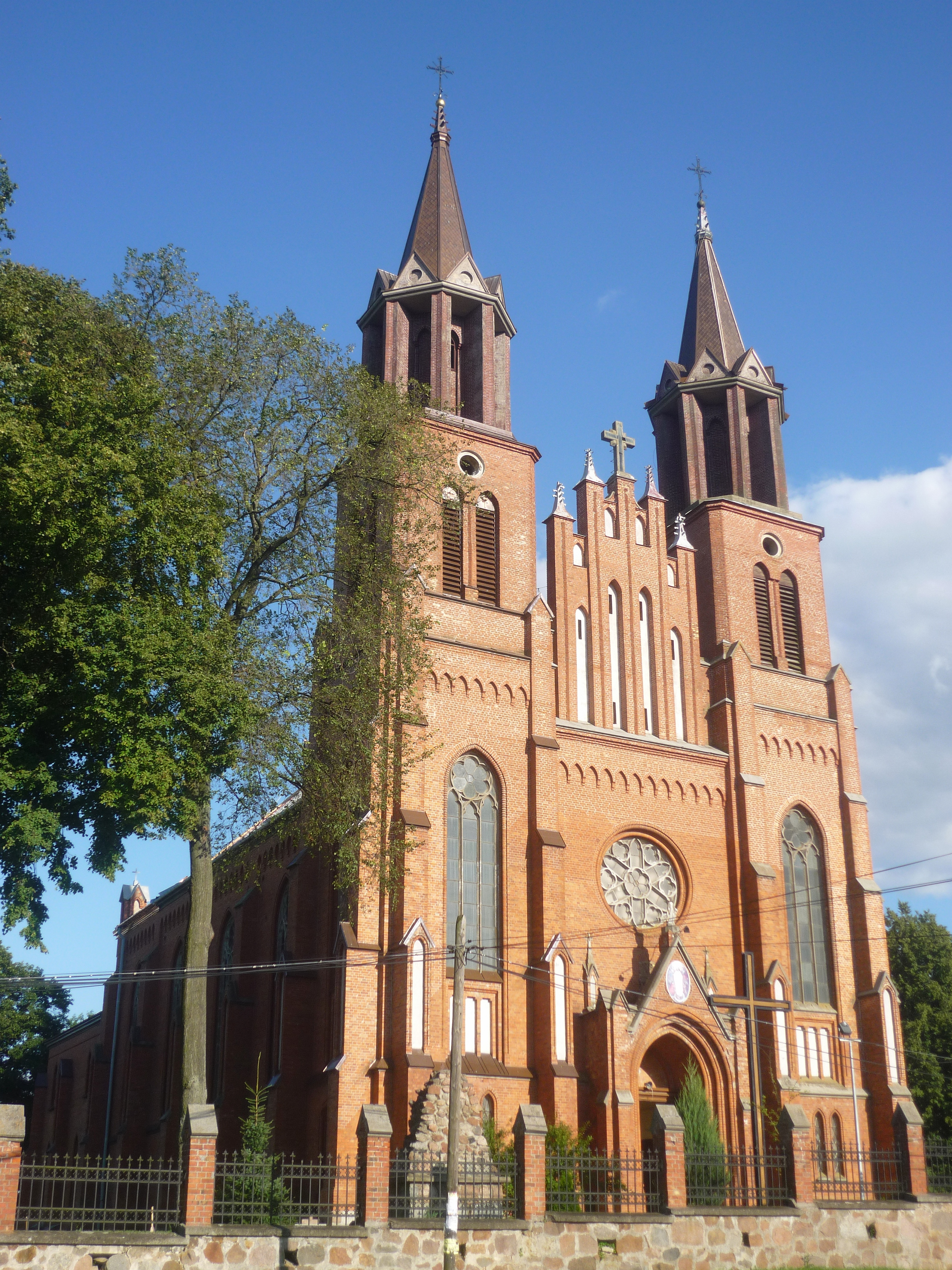
- Church of Saint Archangel Michael

- Location within Poland
- Coordinates: 53°0′N 22°50′E
- Country: Poland
- Voivodeship: Podlaskie
- County: Białystok
- Gmina: Łapy

Population
  - Total: 400

Płonka Kościelna [ˈpwɔŋka kɔɕˈt͡ɕɛlna] is a village in the administrative district of Gmina Łapy, within Białystok County, Podlaskie Voivodeship, in north-eastern Poland.
