= Łapy-Pluśniaki =

- Village
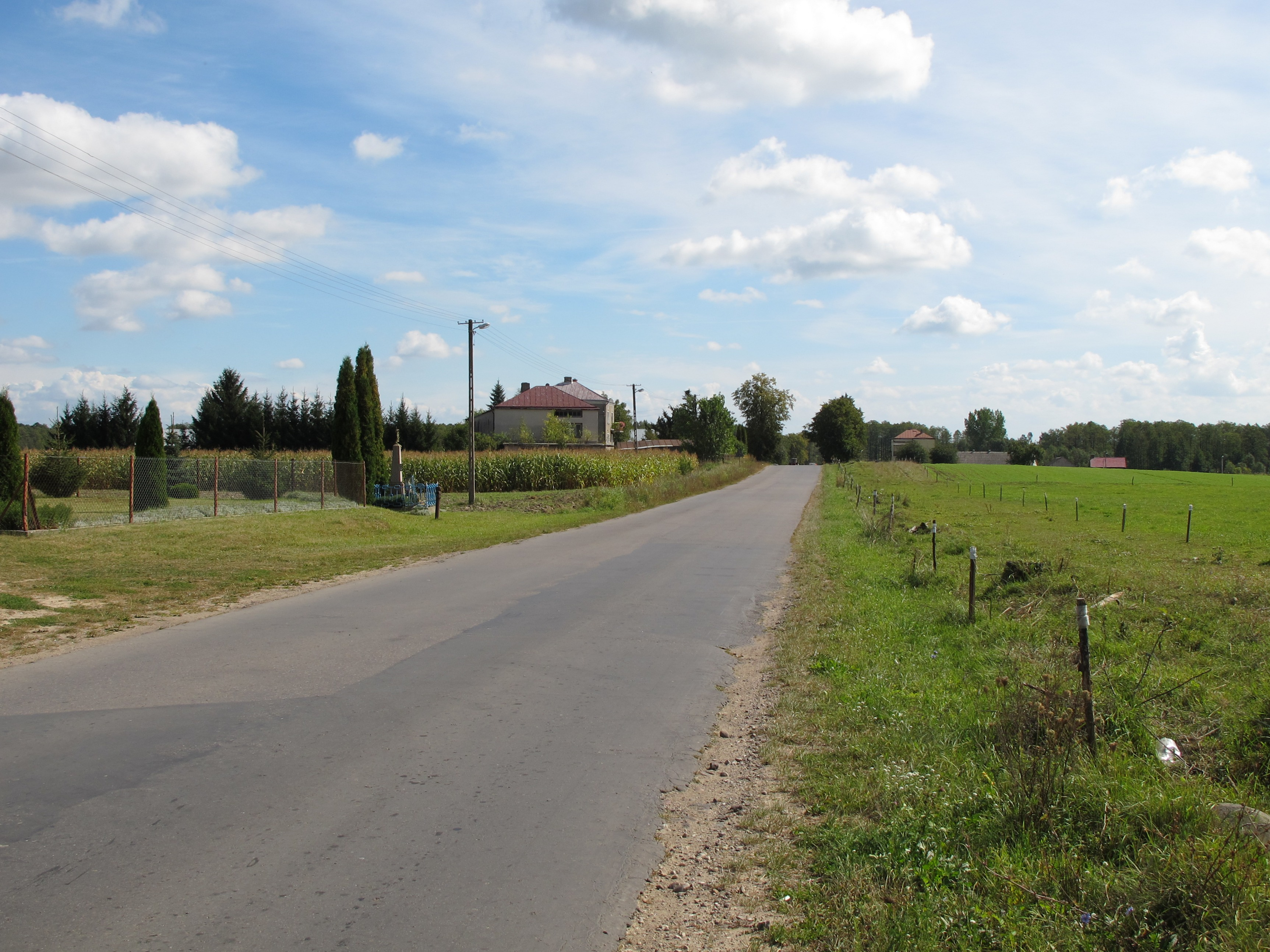
- Unpaved road in Łapy-Pluśniaki

- Location within Poland
- Coordinates: 52°57′45″N 22°53′51″E
- Country: Poland
- Voivodeship: Podlaskie
- County: Białystok
- Gmina: Łapy

Łapy-Pluśniaki [ˈwapɨ pluɕˈɲaki] is a village in the administrative district of Gmina Łapy, within Białystok County, Podlaskie Voivodeship, in north-eastern Poland.
