= Stoczek, Warmian-Masurian Voivodeship =

Village in Warmian-Masurian Voivodeship, Poland

Stoczek
- Village
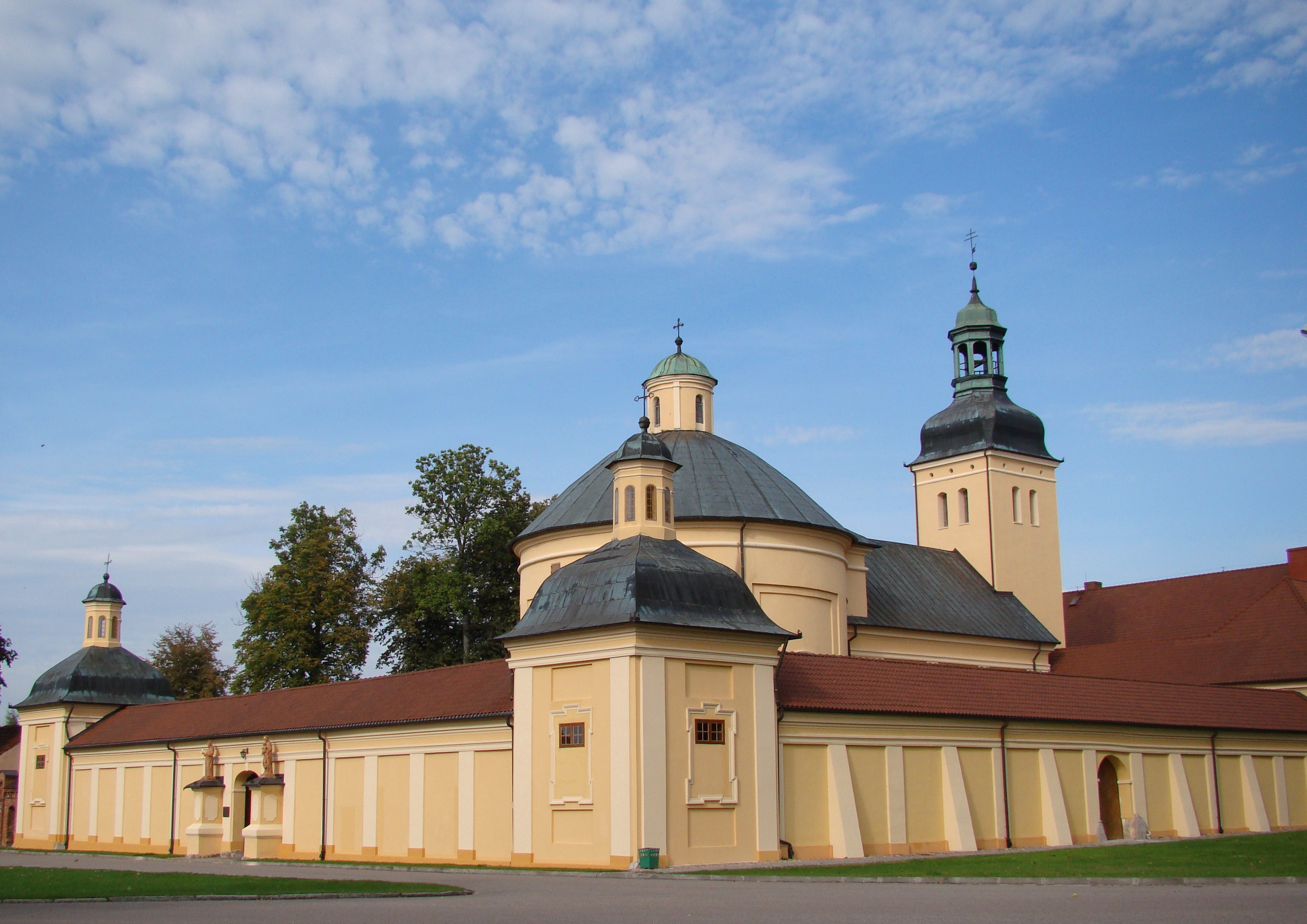
- Sanctuary of Saint Mary in Stoczek Klasztorny

- Location within Poland
- Coordinates: 54°6′59″N 20°44′35″E
- Country: Poland
- Voivodeship: Warmian-Masurian
- County: Lidzbark
- Gmina: Kiwity
- Time zone: UTC+1 (CET)
  - Summer (DST): UTC+2 (CEST)
- Postal code: 11-106
- Vehicle registration: NLI

Stoczek [ˈstɔt͡ʂɛk] is a village in the administrative district of Gmina Kiwity, within Lidzbark County, Warmian-Masurian Voivodeship, in northern Poland. It is located in the historic region of Warmia.

== Details ==
The Baroque Sanctuary of Saint Mary, a notable landmark, listed as a Historic Monument of Poland, is located in Stoczek Klasztorny, a northern part of the village.
