= Gabrysin =

- Village
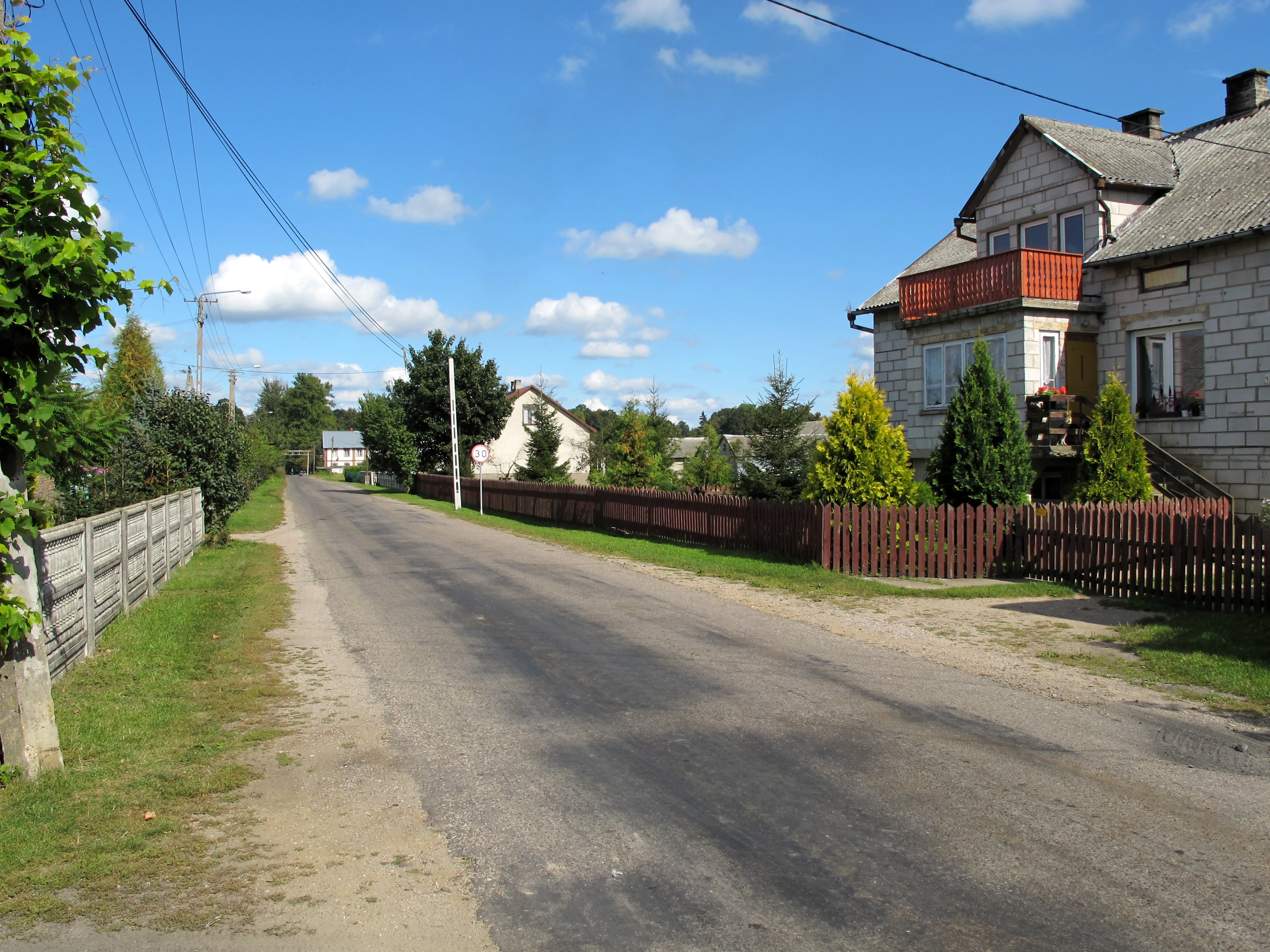
- Road in Gabrysin

- Location within Poland
- Coordinates: 52°53′59″N 22°52′30″E
- Country: Poland
- Voivodeship: Podlaskie
- County: Białystok
- Gmina: Poświętne

Gabrysin [ɡaˈbrɨɕin] is a village in the administrative district of Gmina Poświętne, within Białystok County, Podlaskie Voivodeship, in north-eastern Poland.
