= Gąsówka-Osse =

Village in Gmina Łapy, Poland

- Village
- Location within Poland
- Coordinates: 52°57′45″N 22°53′15″E
- Country: Poland
- Voivodeship: Podlaskie
- County: Białystok
- Gmina: Łapy

Gąsówka-Osse [ɡɔ̃ˈsufka ˈɔssɛ] is a village in the administrative district of Gmina Łapy, within Białystok County, Podlaskie Voivodeship, in north-eastern Poland.
