= Poświętne, Białystok County =

Poświętne
- Village
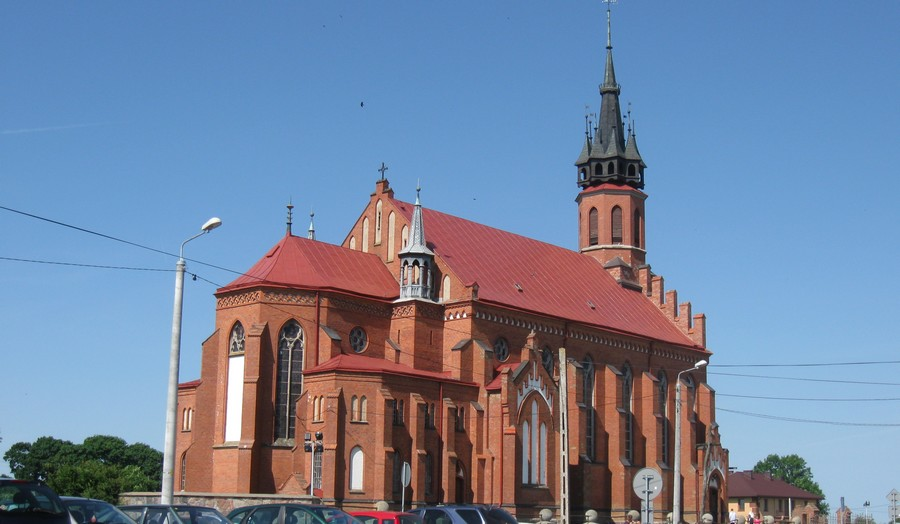

- Location within Poland
- Coordinates: 52°55′22″N 22°49′43″E
- Country: Poland
- Voivodeship: Podlaskie
- County: Białystok
- Gmina: Poświętne
- Population (approx.): 280
- Website: http://gminaposwietne.w.interia.pl

Poświętne [pɔɕˈfjɛntnɛ] is a village in Białystok County, Podlaskie Voivodeship, in north-eastern Poland. It is the seat of the gmina (administrative district) called Gmina Poświętne.
