= Łapy-Dębowina =

- Village
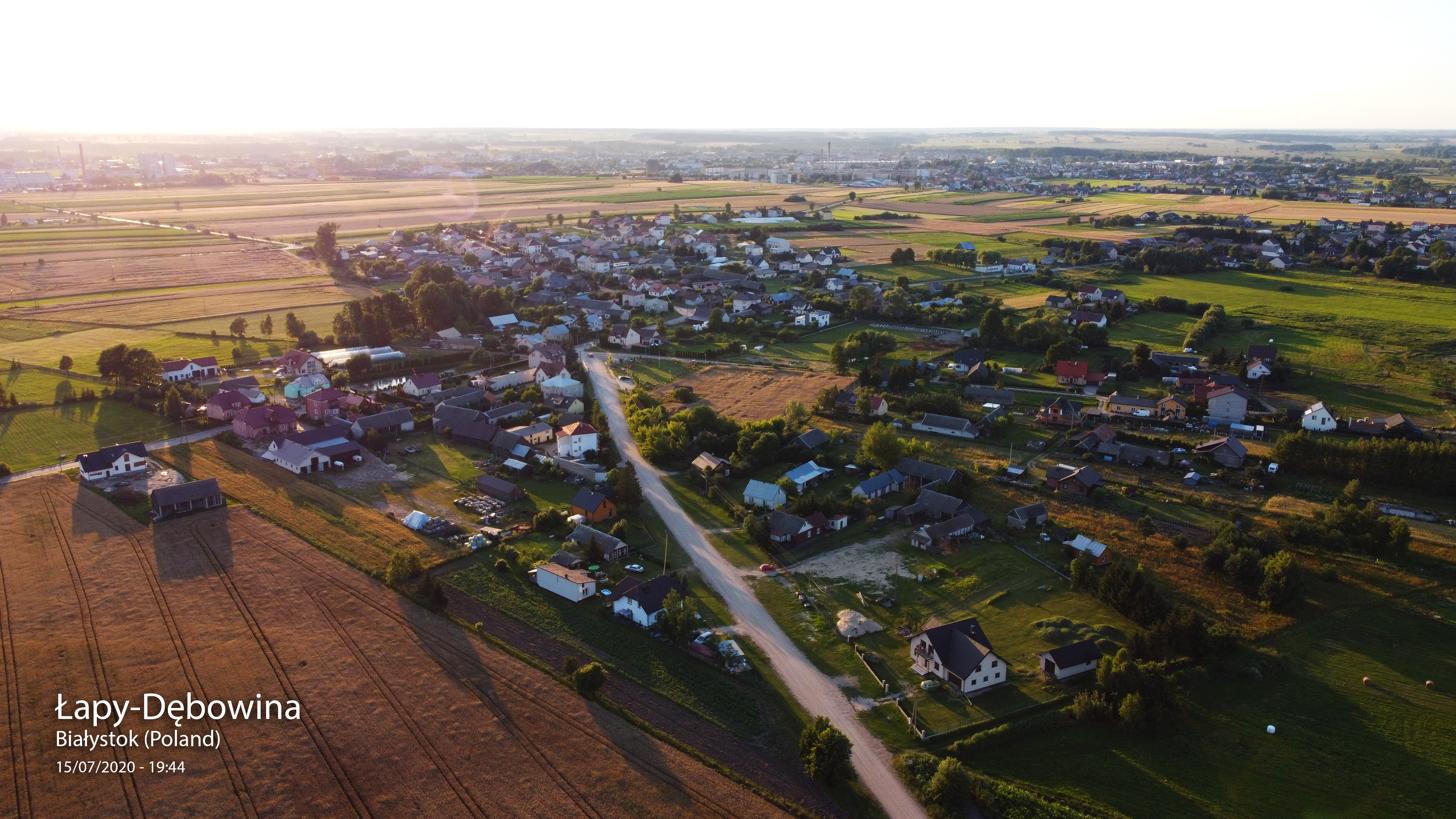
- Aerial photo of Łapy-Dębowina

- Location within Poland
- Coordinates: 52°58′18″N 22°54′04″E
- Country: Poland
- Voivodeship: Podlaskie
- County: Białystok
- Gmina: Łapy
- Population: 864

Łapy-Dębowina [ˈwapɨ dɛmbɔˈvina] is a village in the administrative district of Gmina Łapy, within Białystok County, Podlaskie Voivodeship, in north-eastern Poland.
