= Stara Łupianka =

- Village
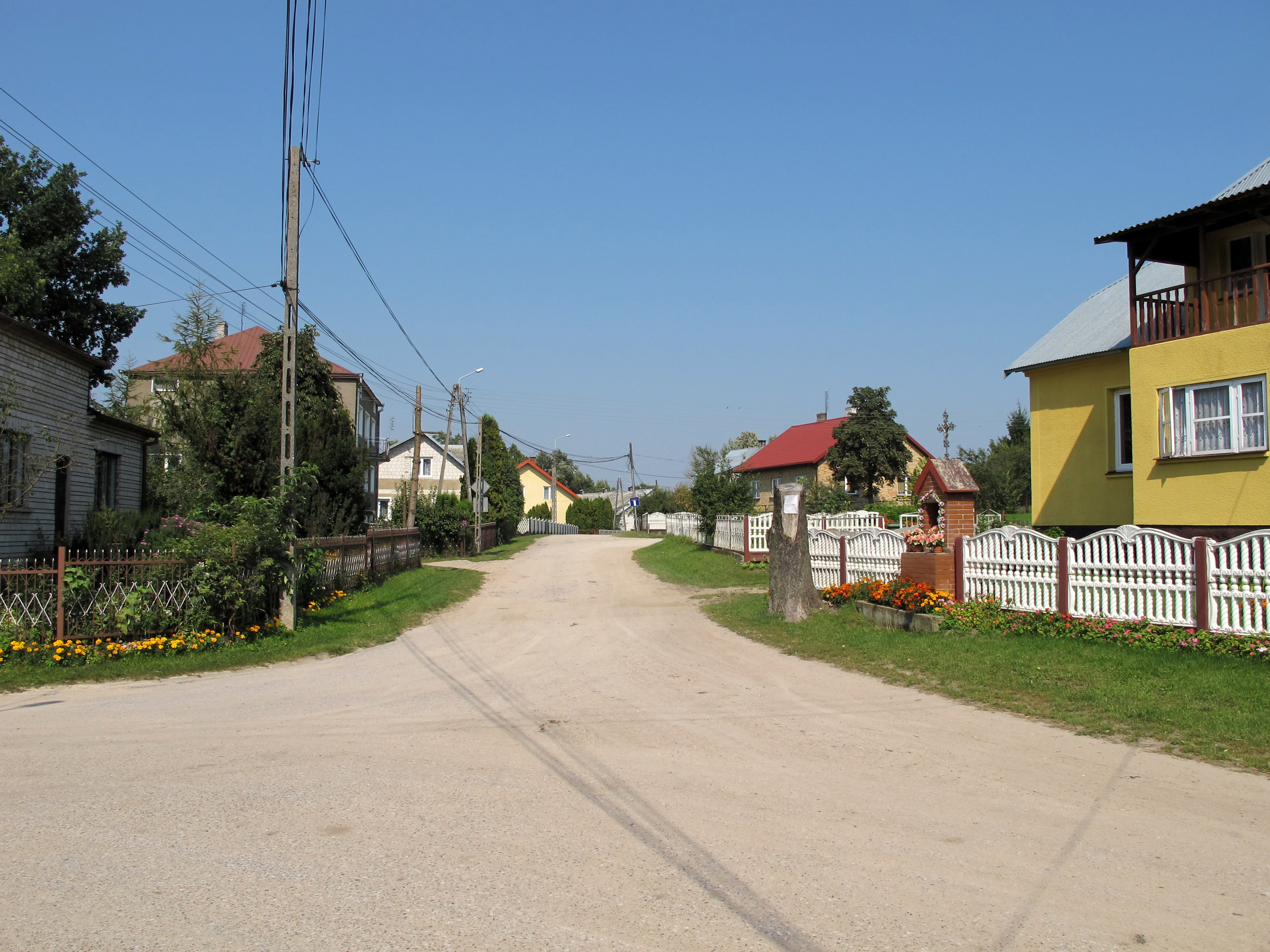
- Houses by the road in Stara Łupianka

- Location within Poland
- Coordinates: 53°02′14.43″N 22°50′51.41″E
- Country: Poland
- Voivodeship: Podlaskie
- County: Białystok
- Gmina: Łapy
- Population: 406

Stara Łupianka [ˈstara wuˈpjaŋka] is a village in the administrative district of Gmina Łapy, within Białystok County, Podlaskie Voivodeship, in north-eastern Poland.

On 1 August 1944, the village was pacified by the Germans. The Germans murdered 15 men and 2 women. The very executions were in retaliation for the village's help rendered to the local Polish partisans.
