= Płonka-Strumianka =

- Village
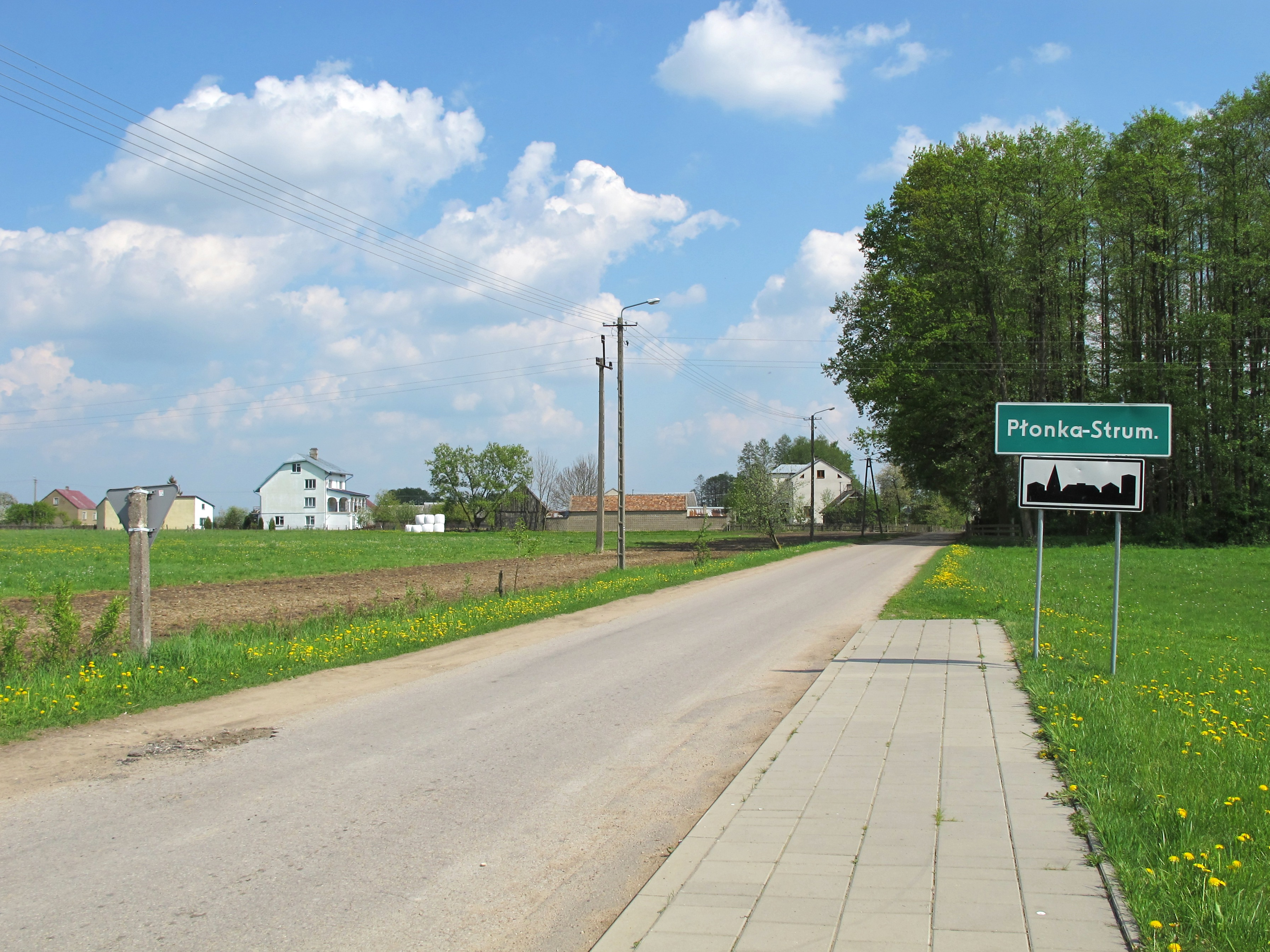

- Location within Poland
- Coordinates: 53°00′15″N 22°50′45″E
- Country: Poland
- Voivodeship: Podlaskie
- County: Białystok
- Gmina: Łapy

Płonka-Strumianka [ˈpwɔŋka struˈmjaŋka] is a village in the administrative district of Gmina Łapy, within Białystok County, Podlaskie Voivodeship, in north-eastern Poland.
