= Bokiny =

- Village
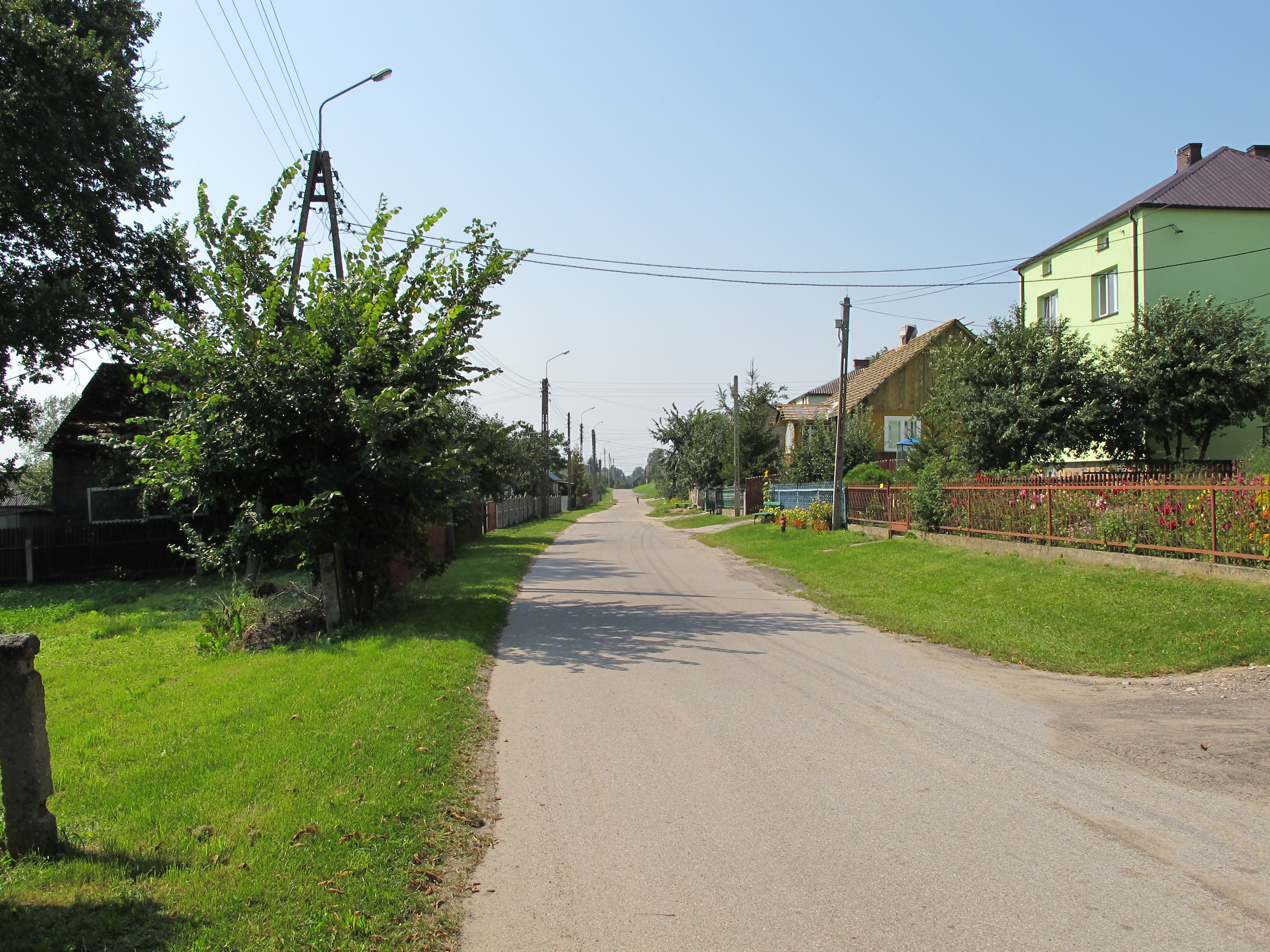

- Location within Poland
- Coordinates: 53°3′N 22°55′E
- Country: Poland
- Voivodeship: Podlaskie
- County: Białystok
- Gmina: Łapy

Bokiny [bɔˈkinɨ] is a village in the administrative district of Gmina Łapy, within Białystok County, Podlaskie Voivodeship, in north-eastern Poland.
