= Pietkowo =

- Village
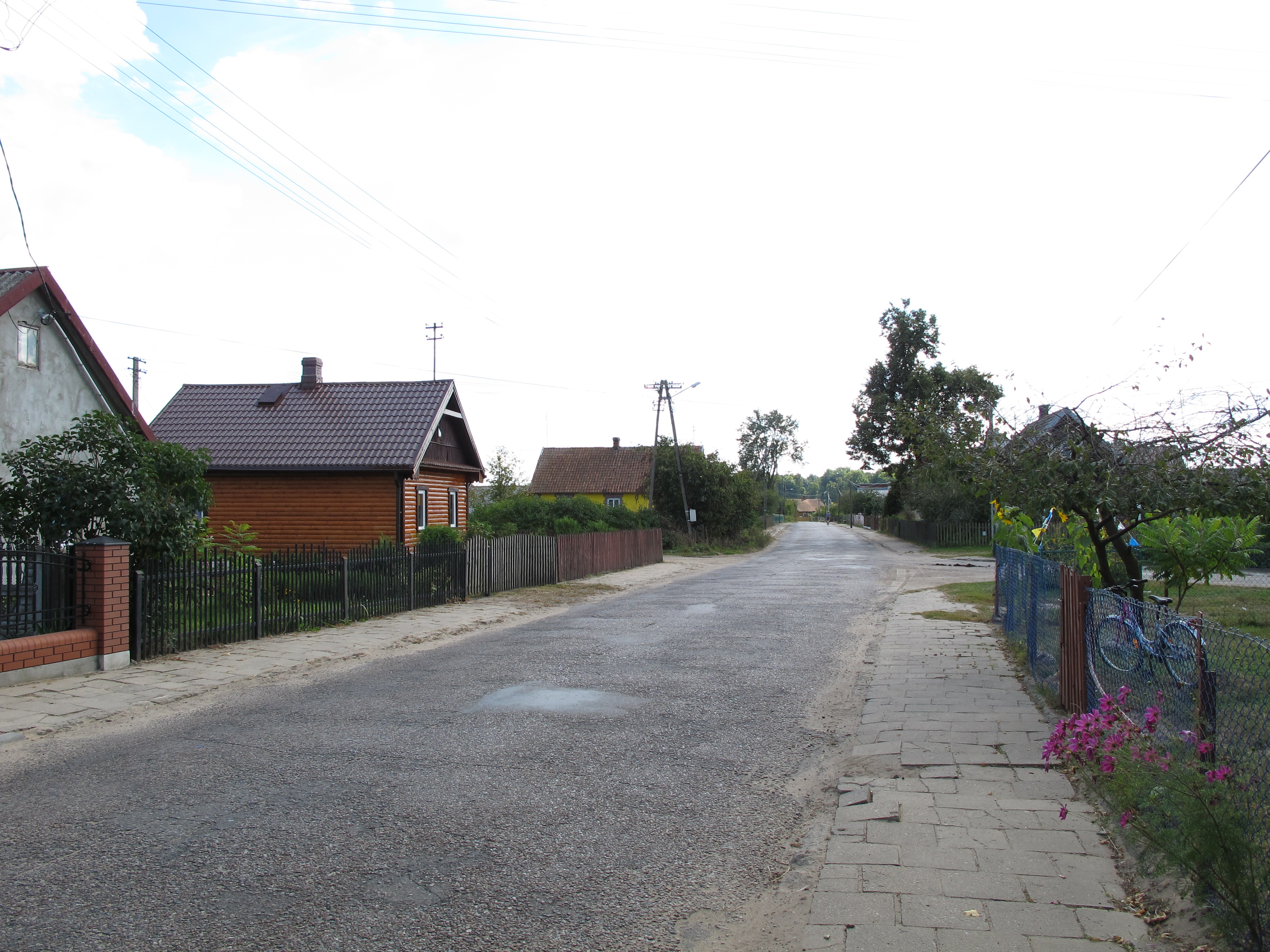

- Location within Poland
- Coordinates: 52°54′N 22°53′E
- Country: Poland
- Voivodeship: Podlaskie
- County: Białystok
- Gmina: Poświętne
- Population: 320

Pietkowo [pjɛtˈkɔvɔ] is a village in the administrative district of Gmina Poświętne, within Białystok County, Podlaskie Voivodeship, in north-eastern Poland.
