= Expressway S61 (Poland) =

Road in Poland

Expressway S61
- Droga ekspresowa S61

Route information
- Length: 213.5 km (132.7 mi)

Major junctions
- From: S 8 near Ostrów Mazowiecka
- To: A 5 Budzisko, Polish-Lithuanian border

Location
- Country: Poland

Highway system
- National roads in Poland; Voivodeship roads
← S 52	→ S 74

Expressway S61 or express road S61 is a Polish highway running from Ostrów Mazowiecka (separating from express road S8) to the Polish-Lithuanian border near Budzisko (continuing as the Lithuanian A5 highway). The route was completed in October 2025.

The road is part of the strategically important Via Baltica, the segment from Tallinn to Warsaw of the European route E67 connecting the Baltic States with the rest of Europe through the exposed Suwałki corridor. Its north-eastern end is also part of the planned Via Carpathia. Across the Lithuanian border the preexisting A5 highway to Kaunas is being upgraded into a divided highway with grade-separated junctions, bringing it to the same standard as the S61 expressway.

== History ==
The expressway became part of the Poland's planned expressway network with the approval of the Council of Ministers of Poland of 20 October 2009. Before that, express road S8 was planned to continue from Białystok north to the Lithuanian border, serving as Via Baltica route. In 2009, S61 was introduced instead, while S8 was decided to end in Białystok. The change provides a shorter route for Via Baltica than originally planned, and the new course is viewed as a way to minimize its environmental impact on protected areas of the wetlands of the Rospuda river valley and the Augustów Primeval Forest in northeastern Poland.

The first section forming the bypass of Stawiski (6.5 km long) was opened to traffic in December 2013 as a single carriageway road. The second carriageway was opened in August 2021.

The second section to open was part of the bypass of Augustów (12 km), opened to traffic in November 2014 as a dual carriageway road.

The third section was the bypass of Szczuczyn (8 km) opened in November 2015 as a single carriageway road. The second carriageway was opened in May 2020.

The fourth section was the bypass of Suwałki (13 km), opened in April 2019 as a dual carriageway road.

The contracts for designing and building the expressway signed in 2017 and 2018 assumed the completion of the whole road by the end of 2021, but parts of it got significantly delayed.

The fifth section (17 km long) was the connection between Śniadowo and Łomża (excluding the bypass of Łomża), opened to traffic in July 2021 as a dual carriageway road.

The sixth section (53 km long) was the connection between Szczuczyn and Kolno, opened in July and August 2021 as a dual carriageway road (which also included reconstruction of the existing bypass of Stawiski and addition of the second carriageway).

The seventh section (20 km long) was the connection between Wysokie and Raczki, opened in December 2021 as a dual carriageway road.

The eighth section (23 km long) was the connection between Szczuczyn and Ełk Południe, opened in September 2022 as a dual carriageway road.

The ninth section (24 km long) was the connection between Suwałki and the Lithuanian border at Budzisko, opened in December 2022 as a dual carriageway road.

The tenth section (24 km long) was the connection between Ełk Południe and Wysokie opened in August 2023 as a dual carriageway road, completing the segment of the road running through the Warmian–Masurian Voivodeship.

The eleventh section (19,5 km long) was the segment from Ostrów Mazowiecka Północ with a junction with the S8 expressway to Śniadowo in the Masovian Voivodeship, opened in October 2023.

The last section (13 km long) was the bypass of Łomża (from Łomża Zachód to Kolno). The first carriageway was opened on 30 September 2024, while the second carriageway was opened on 2 October 2025.

== Exit list ==
Country	Voivodeship	Location	km	mi	Exit	Name	Destinations	Notes
Poland	Mazovian Voivodeship	Gmina Ostrów Mazowiecka			1	Podborze	S 8( E67) – Warsaw/Białystok	Southwestern endpoint of motorway; exit number as part of "experimental signage" Kilometrage starting point Western terminus of E67 continues towards Warsaw
Poland	Mazovian Voivodeship	Gmina Ostrów Mazowiecka			2	Komorowo	DW 627 – Ostrów Mazowiecka/Ostrołęka DW 677 – Łomża	Exit number as part of "experimental signage"
Poland	Mazovian Voivodeship	Gmina Czerwin			3	Śniadowo	DW 677 – Ostrów Mazowiecka/Łomża	Exit number as part of "experimental signage"
Poland	Podlaskie Voivodeship	Gmina Łomża			4	Łomża Południe	DK 63 – Zambrów	South-west end of DK63 overlap Exit number as part of "experimental signage"
Poland	Podlaskie Voivodeship	Gmina Łomża			5	Łomża Zachód	DK 61 – Ostrołęka/Łomża	
Poland	Podlaskie Voivodeship	Gmina Łomża			6	Nowogród	DW 645 – Nowogród/Łomża	
Poland	Podlaskie Voivodeship	Gmina Łomża			7	Łomża Północ	DK 64 – Białystok	
Poland	Podlaskie Voivodeship	Gmina Łomża			8	Kolno	DK 63 – Kolno	North end of DK63 overlap Exit number as part of "experimental signage"
Poland	Podlaskie Voivodeship	Gmina Stawiski			9	Stawiski	DW 647 – Stawiski/Kolno	Exit number as part of "experimental signage"
Poland	Podlaskie Voivodeship	Gmina Grabowo			10	Grabowo	Grabowo	Exit number as part of "experimental signage"
Poland	Podlaskie Voivodeship	Gmina Szczuczyn			11	Szczuczyn	DK 58 – Szczuczyn/Pisz	Exit number as part of "experimental signage"
Poland	Podlaskie Voivodeship	Gmina Szczuczyn			12	Guty	DW 665 – Grajewo/Augstów	
Poland	Warmian-Masurian Voivodeship	Gmina Ełk			13	Ełk Południe	DK 65 – Ełk/Białystok	Overlap with DK 65 starts
Poland	Warmian-Masurian Voivodeship	Gmina Ełk			14	Ełk Wschód	S 16 / DK 65 – Ełk/Olsztyn	Overlap with DK 65 ends, DK 16 starts
Poland	Warmian-Masurian Voivodeship	Gmina Kalinowo			15	Kalinowo	DK 16 – Ełk/Augustów	Overlap with DK 16 ends
Poland	Podlaskie Voivodeship	Gmina Raczki			16	Raczki	DK 8( E67) – Białystok/Raczki	
Poland	Podlaskie Voivodeship	Gmina Suwałki			17	Suwałki Południe	DW 655 – Suwałki/Olecko	Exit number as part of "experimental signage"
Poland	Podlaskie Voivodeship	Suwałki			18	Suwałki Zachód	DW 653 – Suwałki/Olecko	Exit number as part of "experimental signage"
Poland	Podlaskie Voivodeship	Suwałki			19	Suwałki Północ	DW 662 – Suwałki	
Poland	Podlaskie Voivodeship	Gmina Szypliszki			20	Szypliszki	DW 651 – Gołdap/Sejny	
Poland	Podlaskie Voivodeship	Gmina Szypliszki			—	Lithuania–Poland border	A 5	Border with Lithuania road continues as the Lithuanian A5
1.000 mi = 1.609 km; 1.000 km = 0.621 mi: Concurrency terminus; Route transition

== See also ==
- Highways in Poland

== Sources ==
- Announcement of giving decision describing environmental conditions for building Augustów beltway (in Polish), Polish Directorate of Environmental Protection
