= National road 8 (Poland) =

National road in Poland

Coordinates: 51°58′38″N 20°30′24″E

National Road 8
- Droga krajowa nr 8
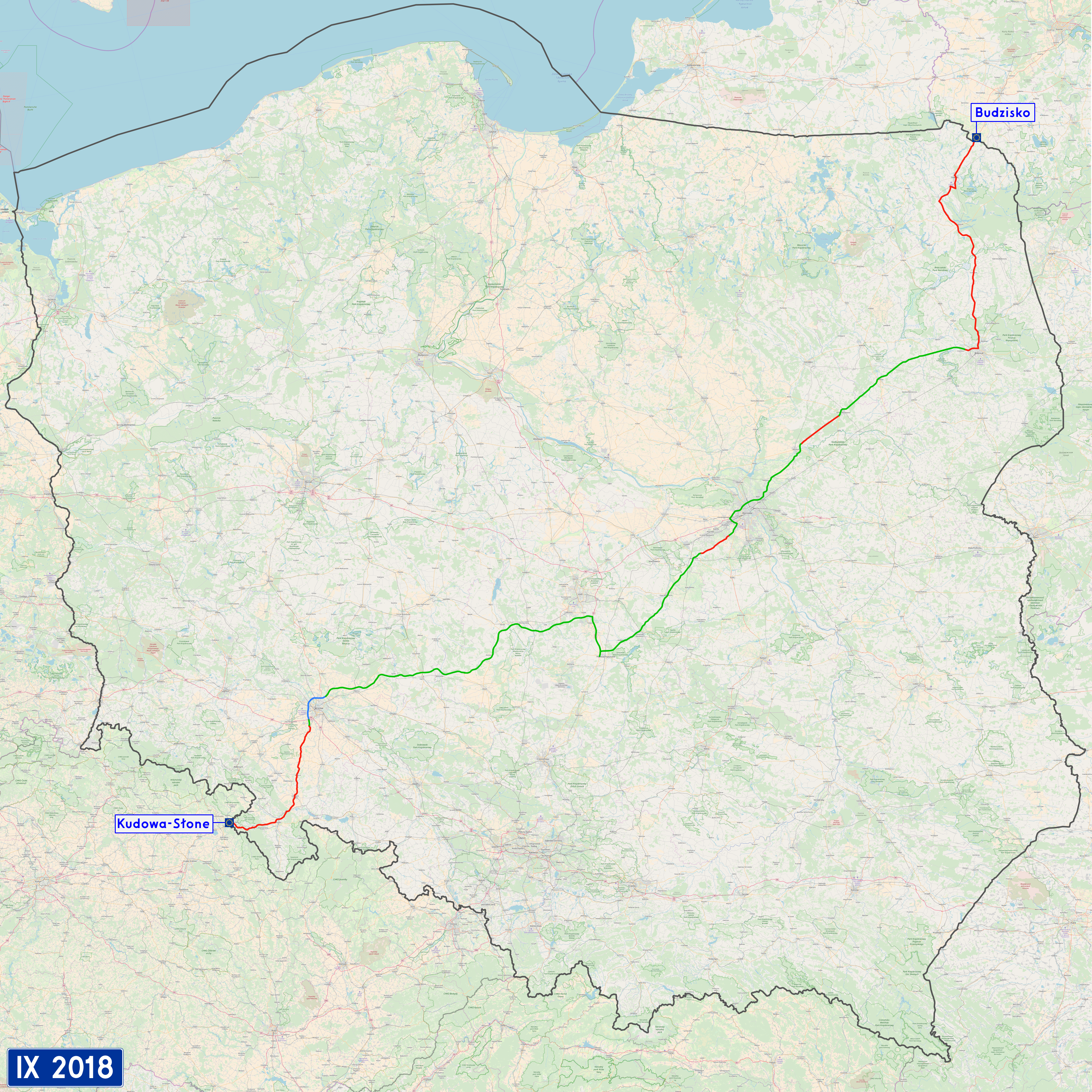
- Trunk road standard Expressway (S8) standard Wrocław Motorway Bypass (A8)

Route information
- Part of E67
- Maintained by GDDKiA
- Length: 753 km (468 mi)
- Existed: 1986–present

Major junctions
- South end: Kudowa-Zdrój (PL-CZ border)
- North end: S 61 in Raczki

Location
- Country: Poland
- Regions: Lower Silesian Voivodeship; Greater Poland Voivodeship; Łódź Voivodeship; Masovian Voivodeship; Podlaskie Voivodeship
- Major cities: Wrocław, Warsaw, Białystok

Highway system
- National roads in Poland; Voivodeship roads
← DK 7	→ DK 9

National road 8 (Polish: Droga krajowa nr 8, abbreviated as DK8) is a route in the Polish national road network, running diagonally through Poland from the Czech border in Kudowa Zdrój in the south-west to Raczki near the border with Lithuania in the north-east, through the Lower Silesia, Greater Poland, Łódź, Masovian and Podlaskie voivodeships. For most of its length it forms the Polish section of the European route E67 known as the Via Baltica between Warsaw and Tallinn.

Until 2022 it was the longest road in Poland with a total length of 804 km. In December 2022 the last segment of the DK 8 to Budzisko on the border with Lithuania was made part of the DK 61.

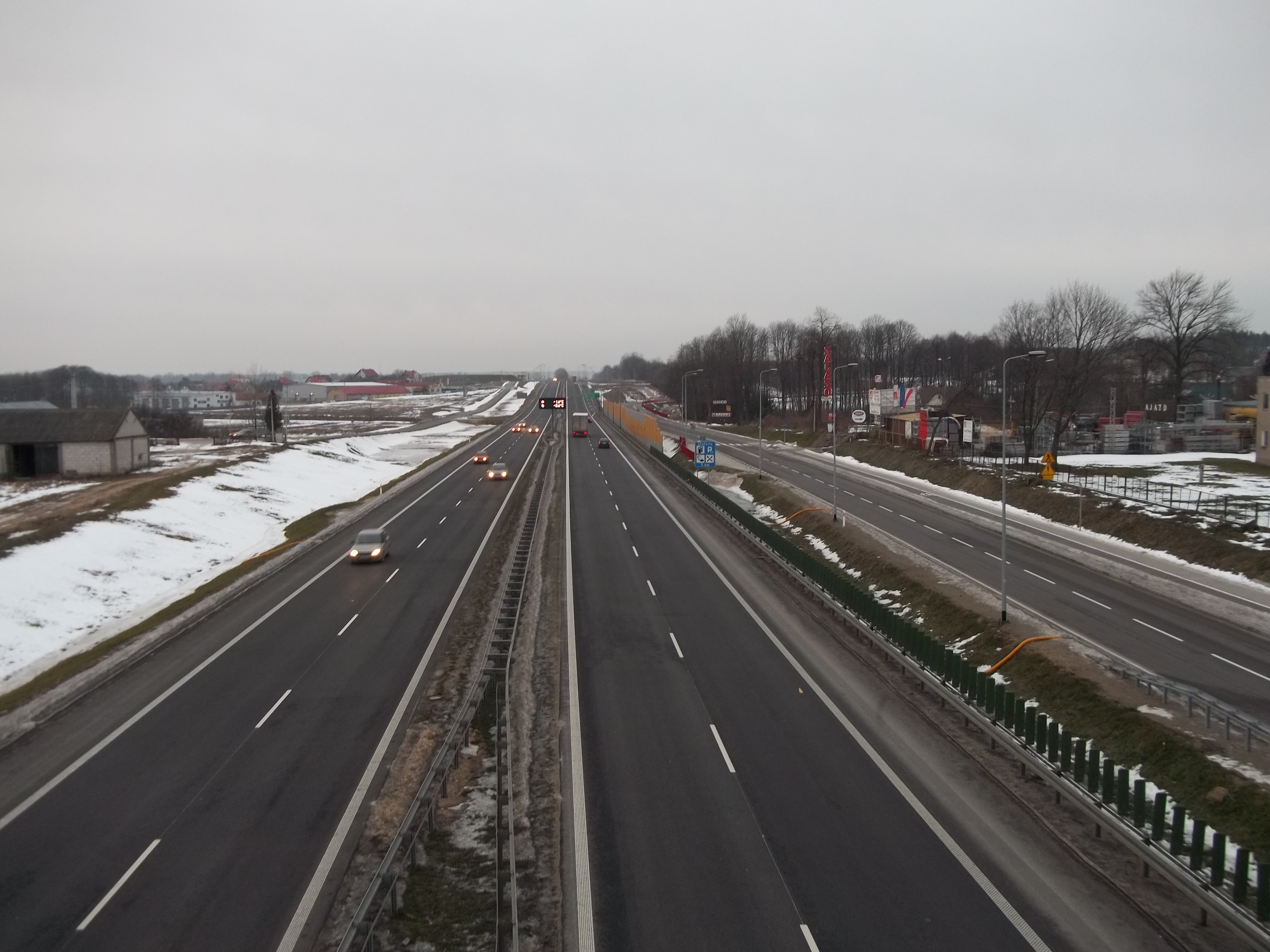
S 8 in Choroszcz, near Białystok

== A8 motorway ==
The route of the Wrocław Motorway Bypass has the status of a motorway marked as A8.

== Expressway S8 ==
The middle section of the route, from the A8 motorway to Białystok, has the status of an expressway marked as S8.

== Major cities and towns along the route ==
Town/City	Way 1	Way 2	Way 3 / 4 / 5	Ring road
Kudowa-Zdrój				
Lewin Kłodzki				
Duszniki-Zdrój				
Szczytna				
Polanica-Zdrój				
Kłodzko	DK 33	DK 46		
Ząbkowice Śląskie				
Niemcza				
Łagiewniki	DK 39			
Wrocław	DK 5	DK 94	DK 98	A 8
Oleśnica				S 8
Syców				S 8
Kępno	DK 11			S 8
Wieruszów				S 8
Walichnowy	DK 74			S 8
Wieluń	DK 43	DK 45		
Osjaków				
Szczerców				
Bełchatów				
Piotrków Trybunalski	DK 1	DK 12	DK 91	A 1 S 8
Tomaszów Mazowiecki	DK 48			S 8
Rawa Mazowiecka	DK 72			S 8
Mszczonów	DK 50			
Warsaw	DK 2	DK 7	DK 17 DK 61 DK 79	
Marki				
Radzymin				S 8
Wyszków	DK 62			S 8
Ostrów Mazowiecka	DK 50	DK 60		S 8
Zambrów	DK 63	DK 66		S 8
Stare Jeżewo	DK 64			S 8
Choroszcz				S 8
Białystok	DK 19	DK 65		
Suchowola				
Augustów	DK 16	DK 61		
Raczki	S 61			

in construction	in planned	built

Droga krajowa nr 8
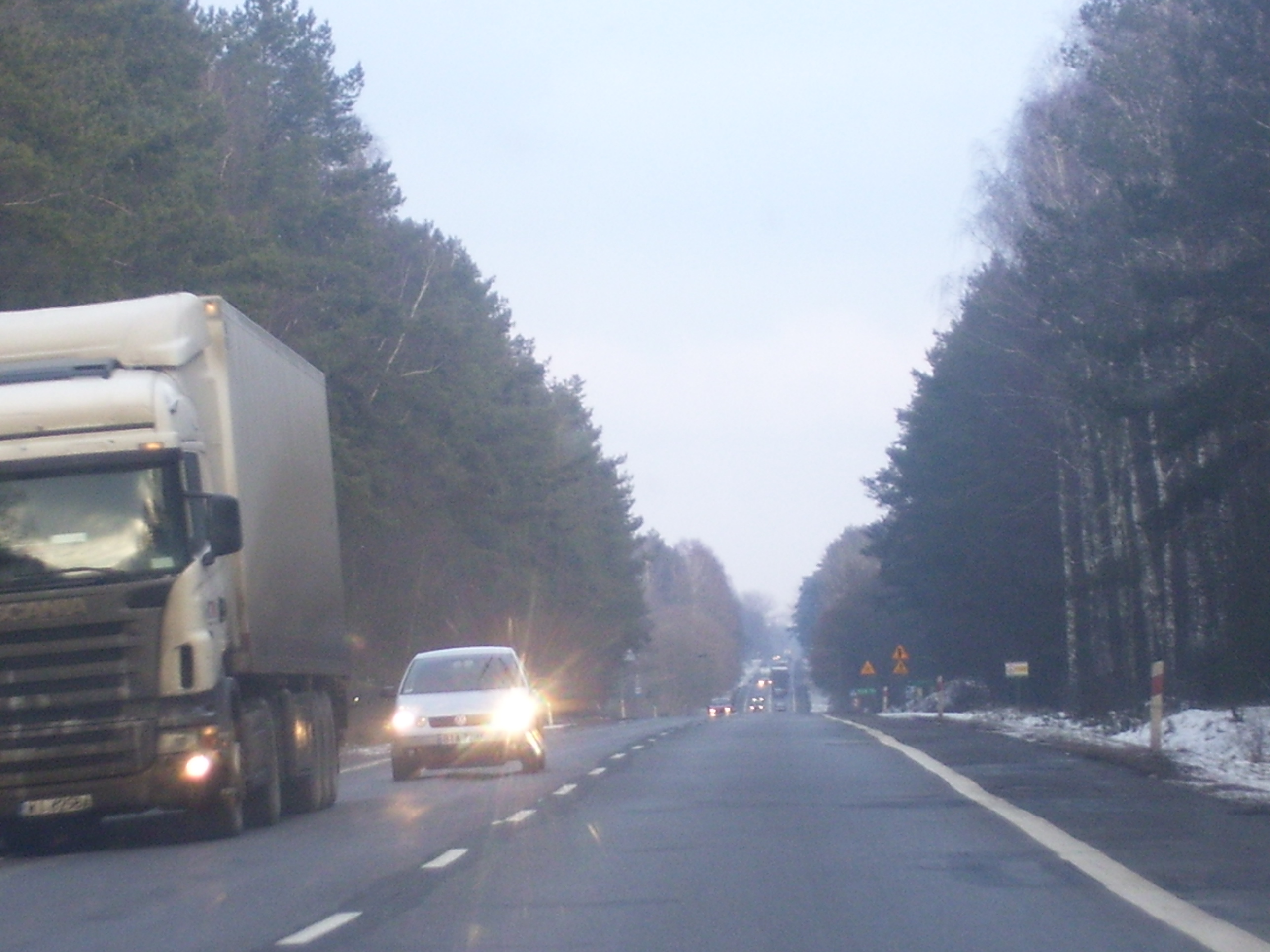
Przyjmy

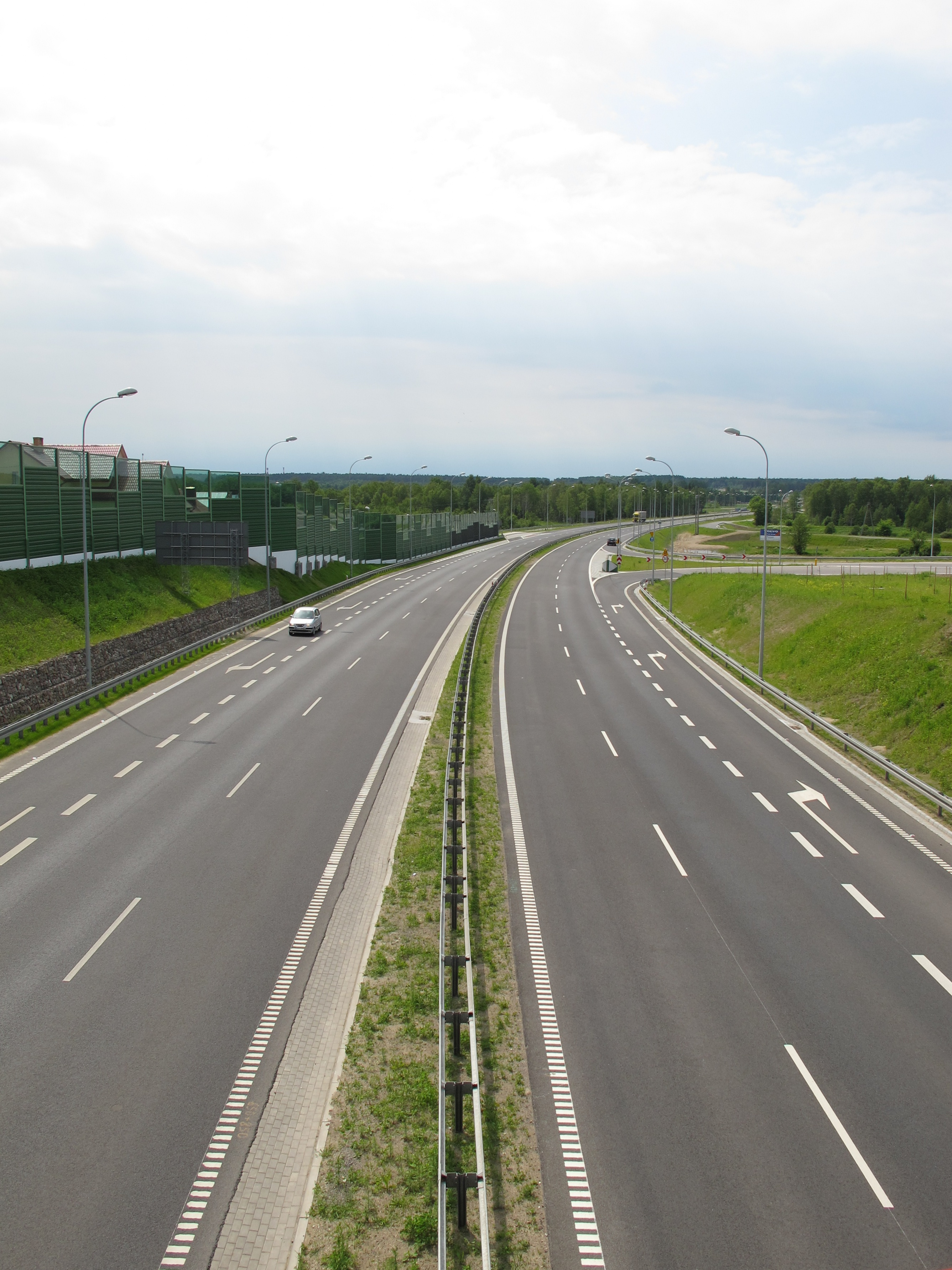
Jurowce, Podlaskie Voivodeship near Białystok

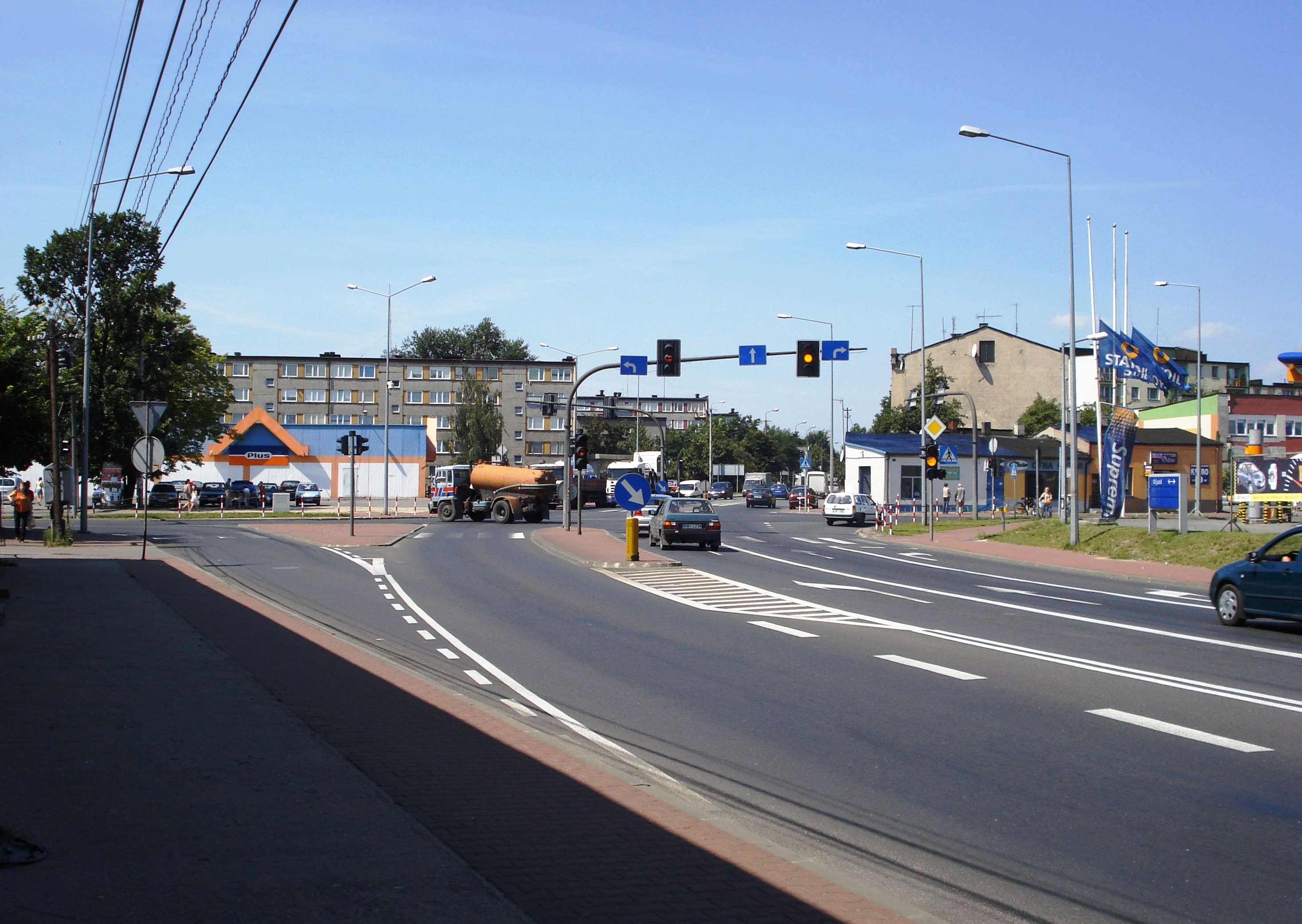
Wieluń

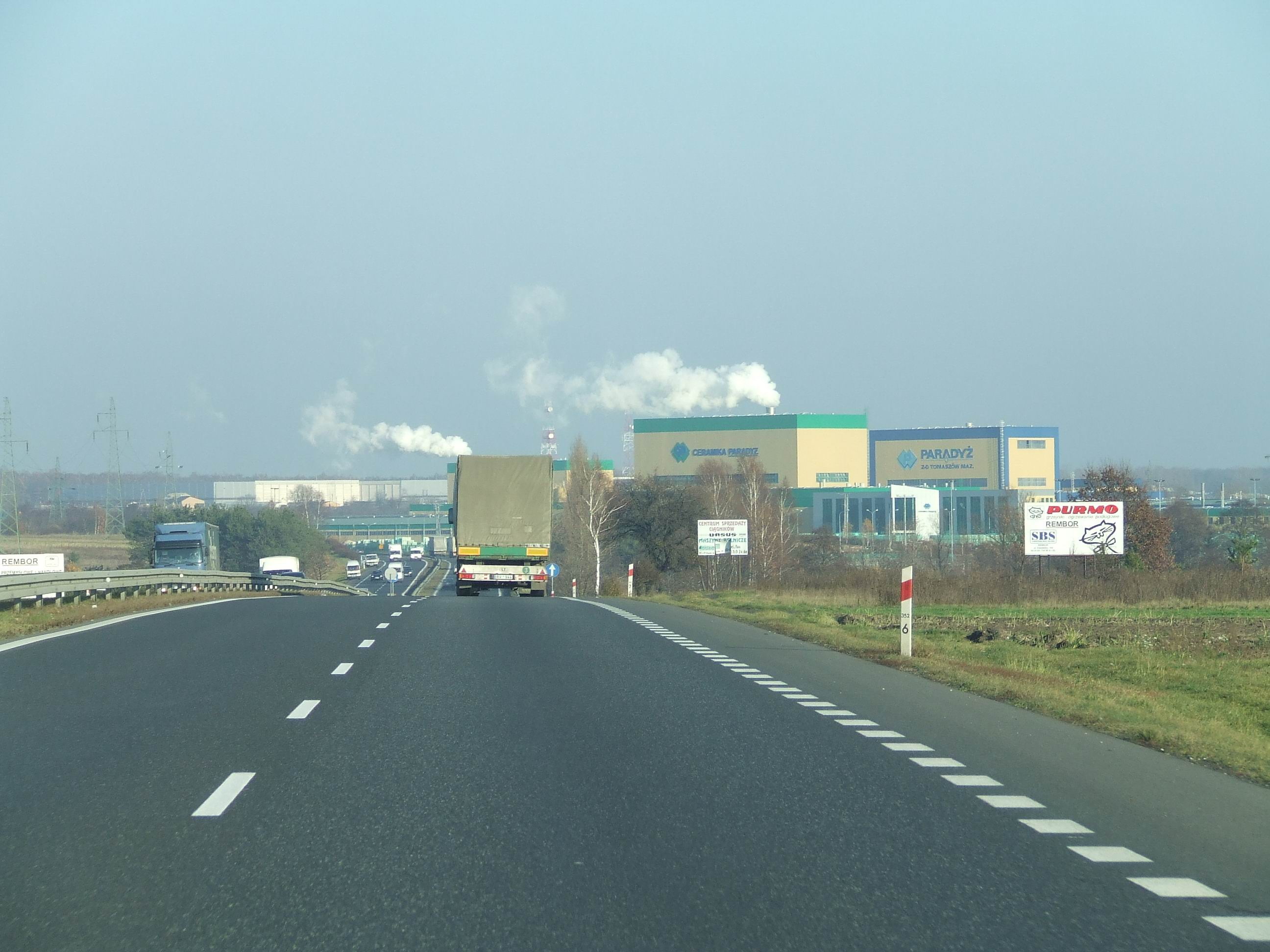
Tomaszów Mazowiecki

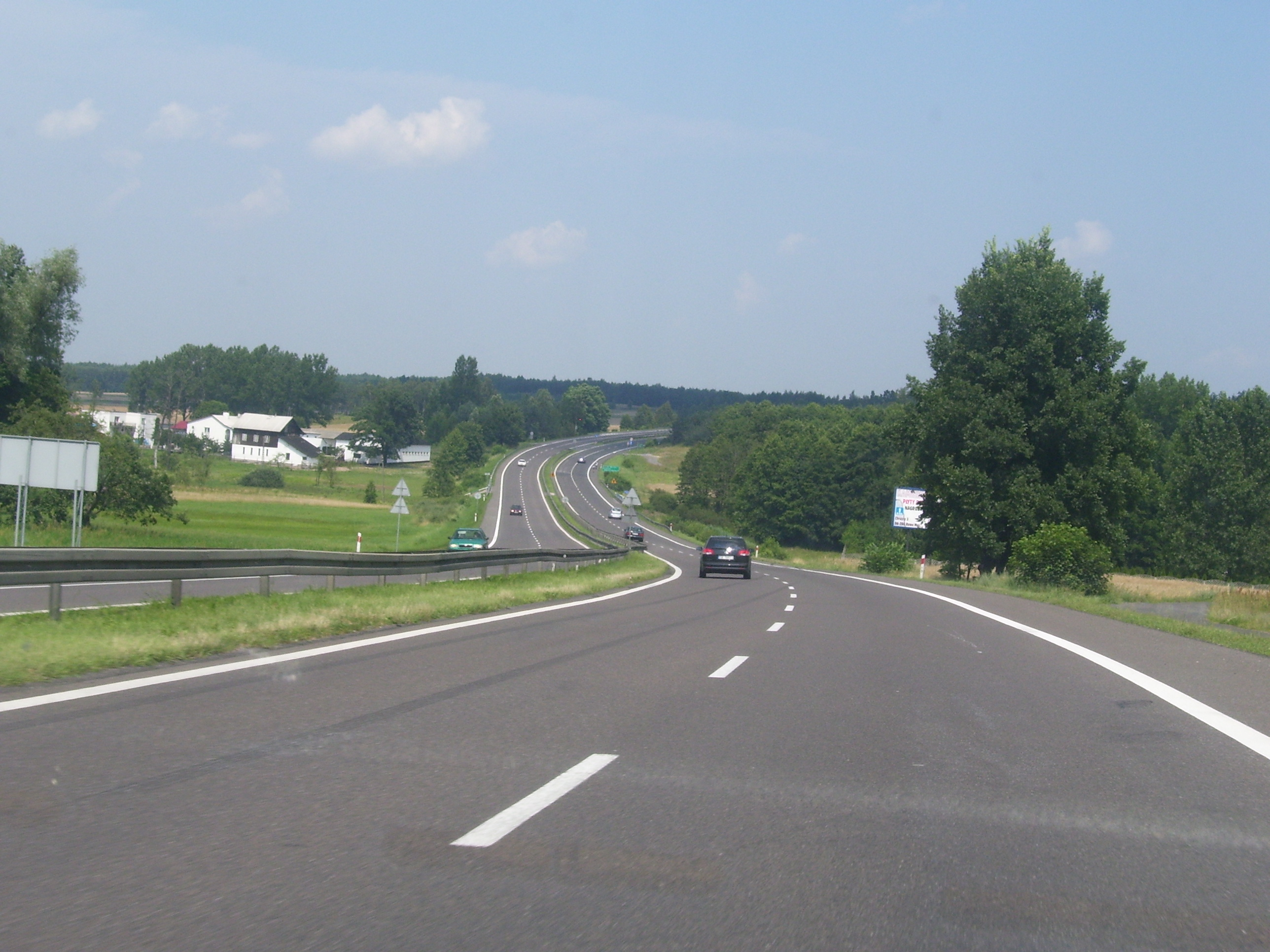
Podkonica

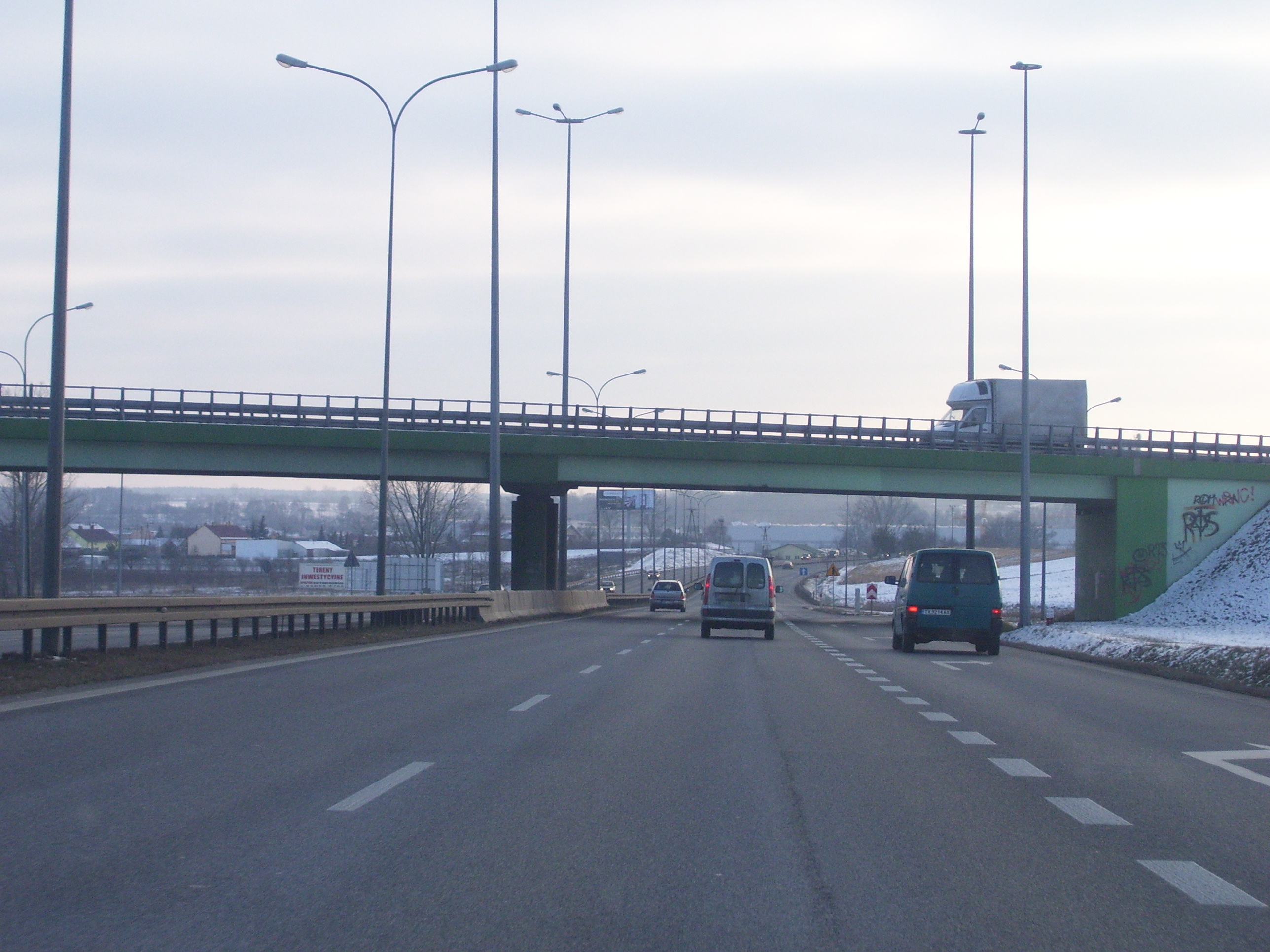
Bypass of Rawa Mazowiecka

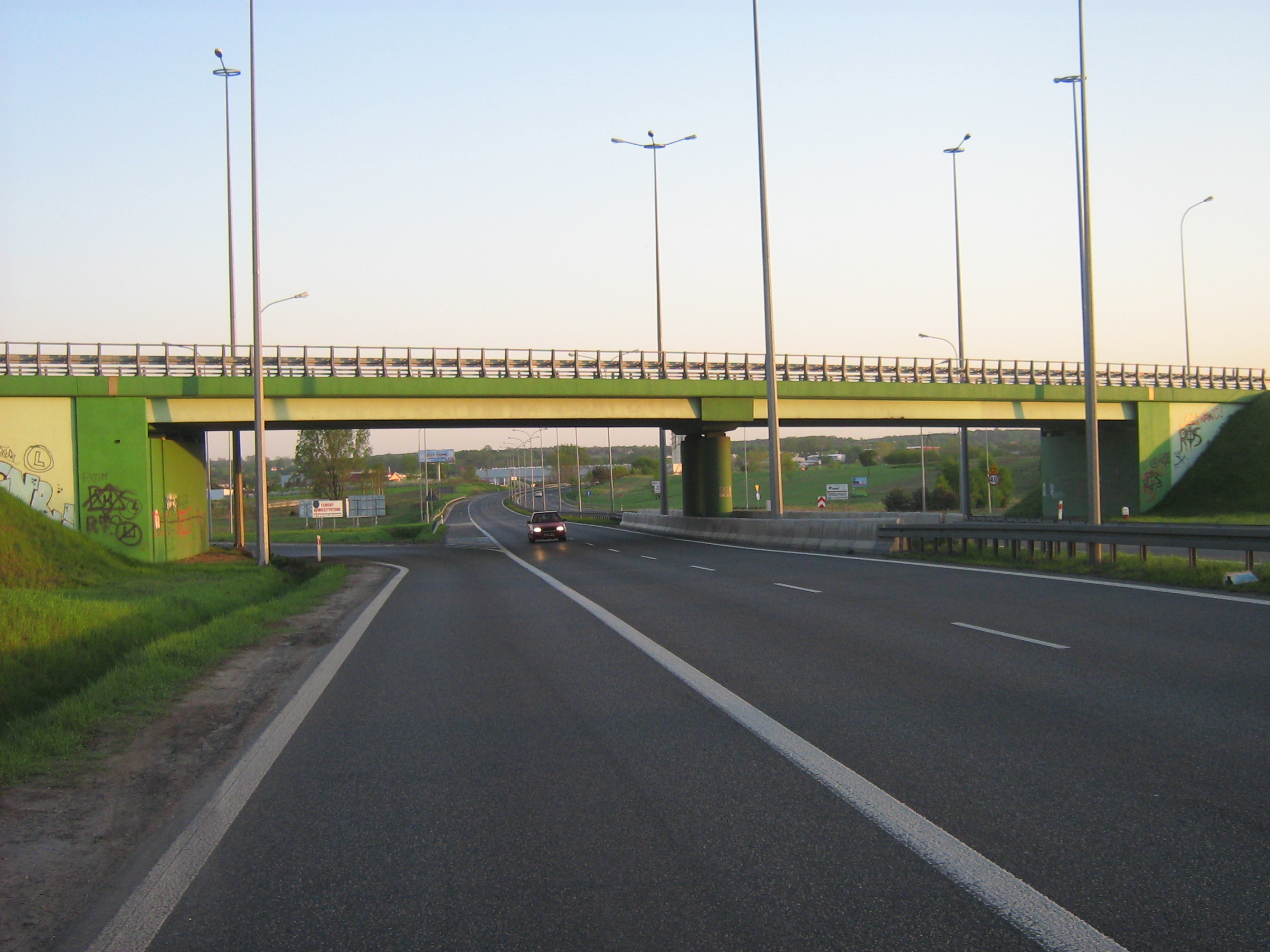
Bypass of Rawa Mazowiecka

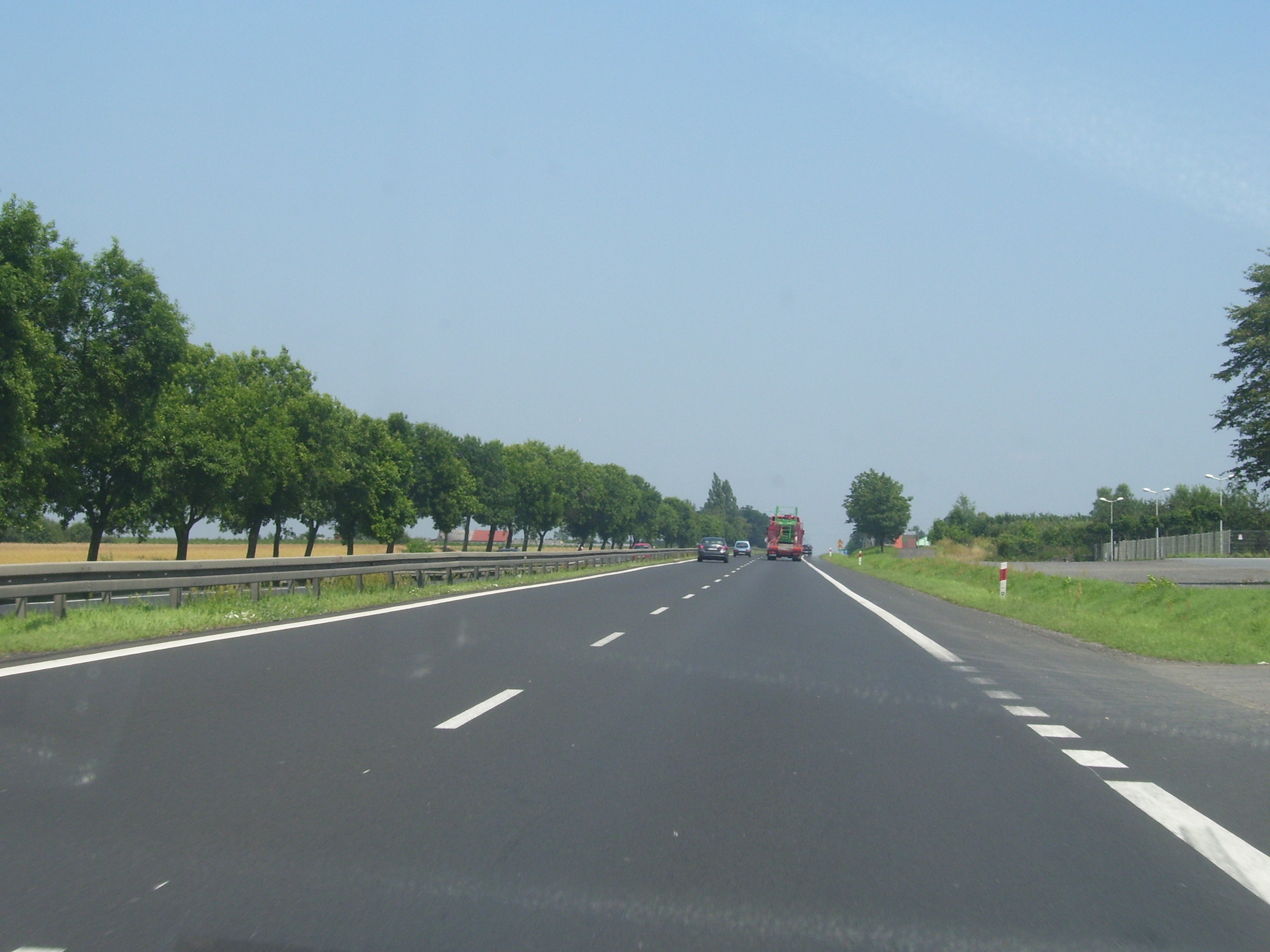
Konopnicy near Rawa

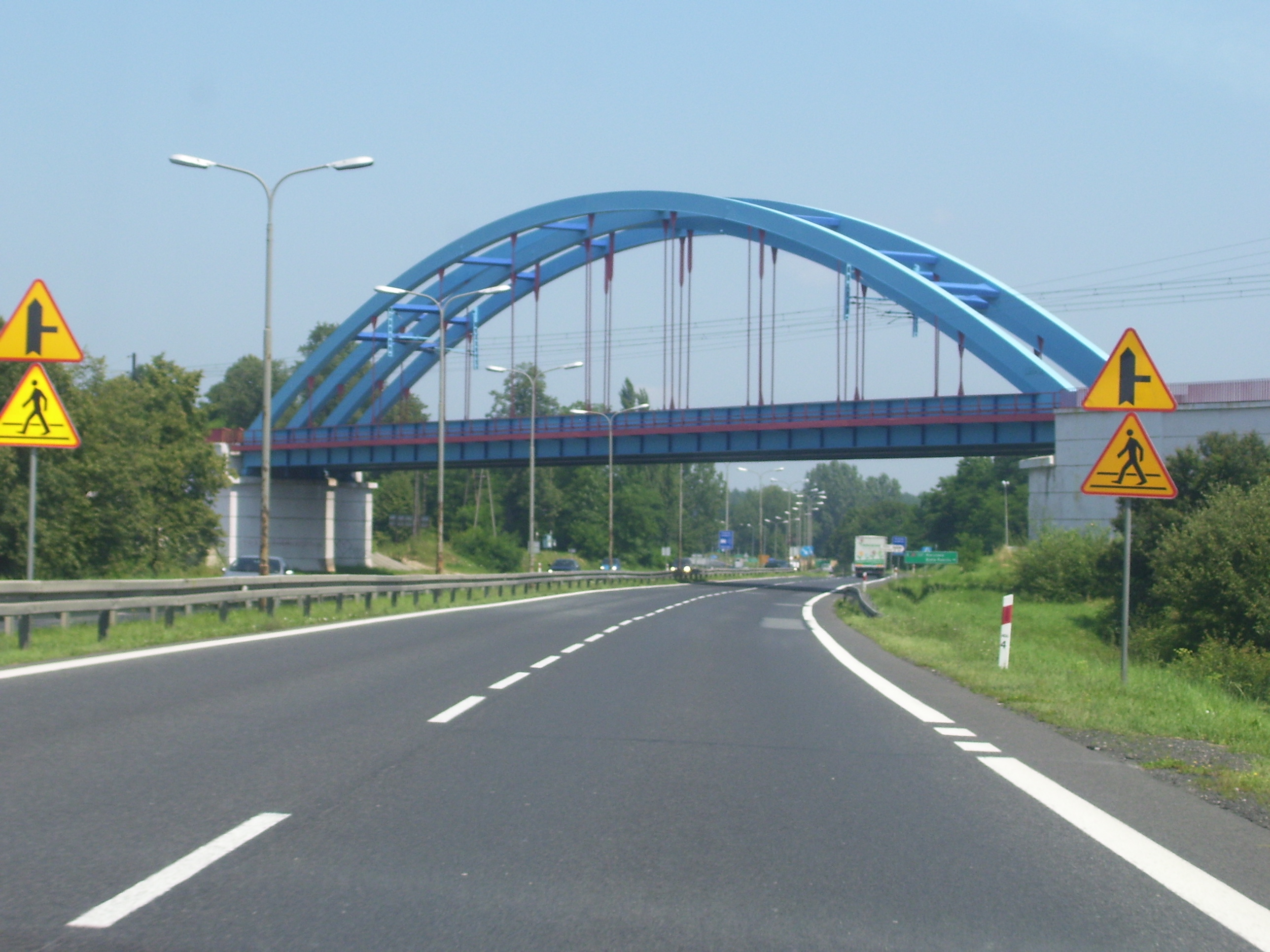
Viaduct of the Central Rail Line in Huta Zawadzka before intersection with DK 70 outside Mszczonów

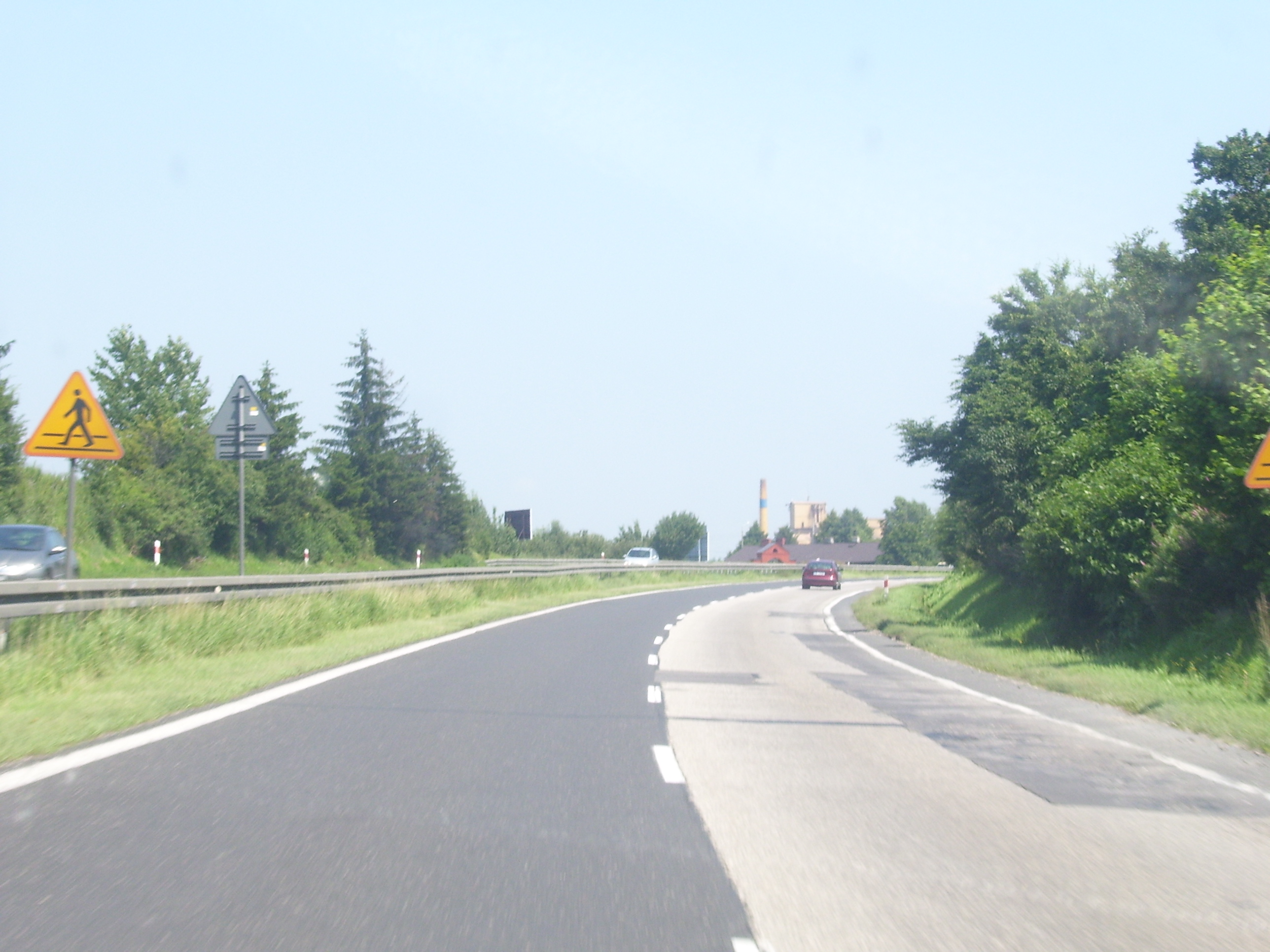
Bypass of Mszczonów

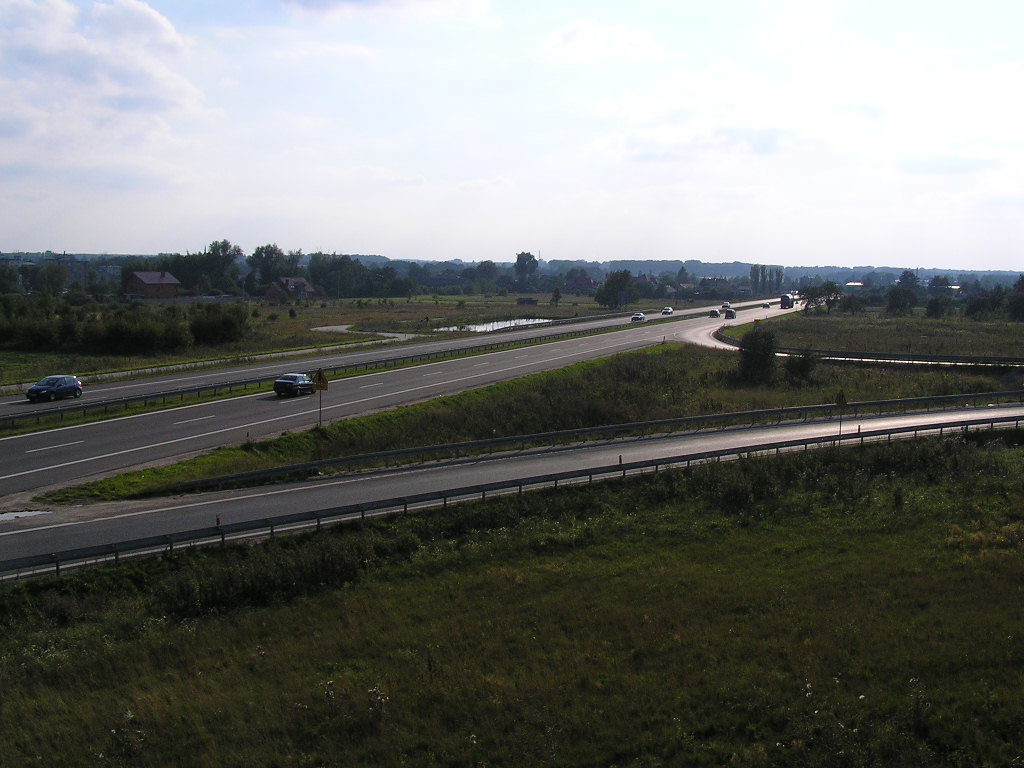
Bypass of Mszczonów

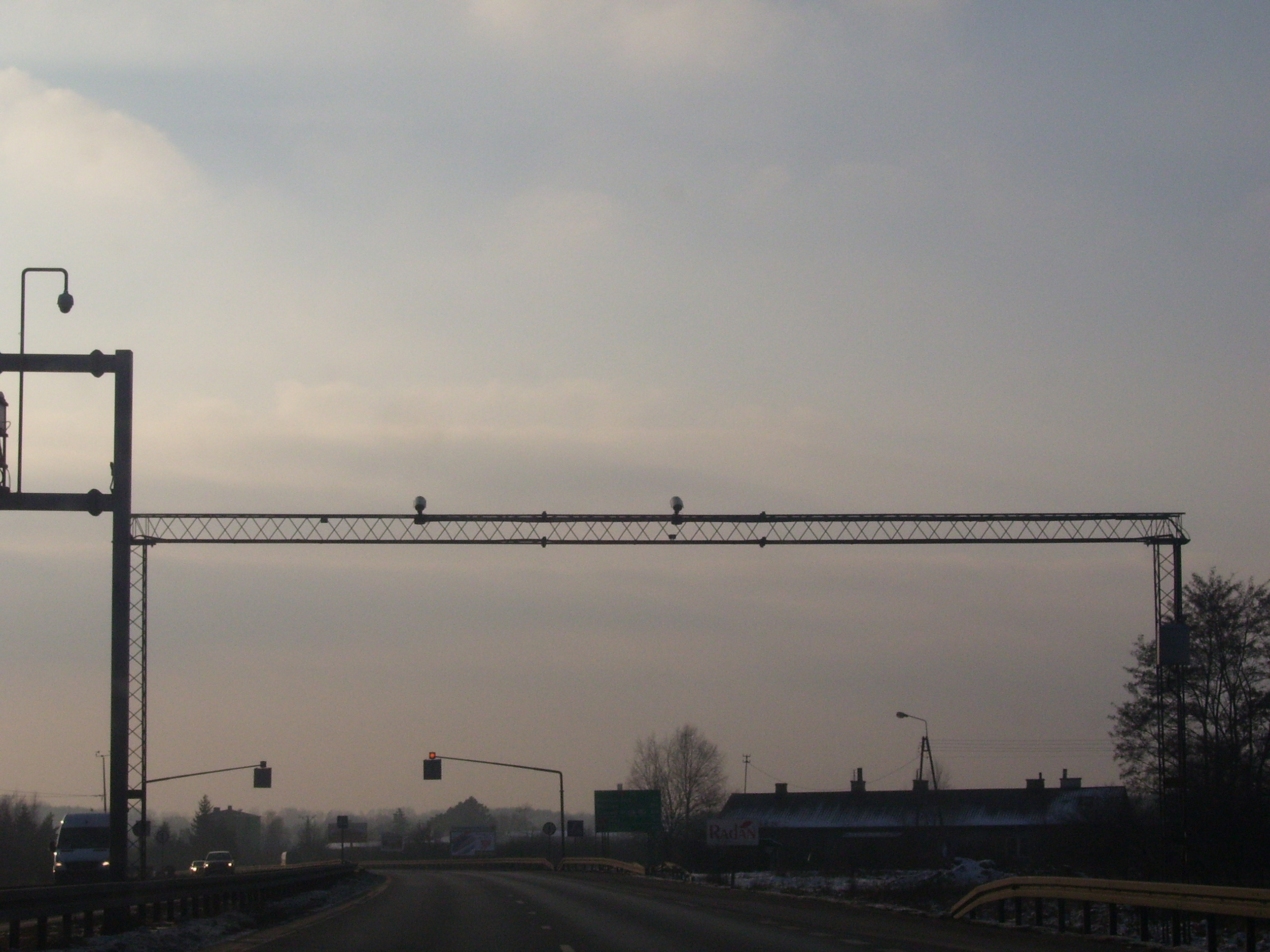
The monitoring system through No. 8 for viewing photos on the internet with the way

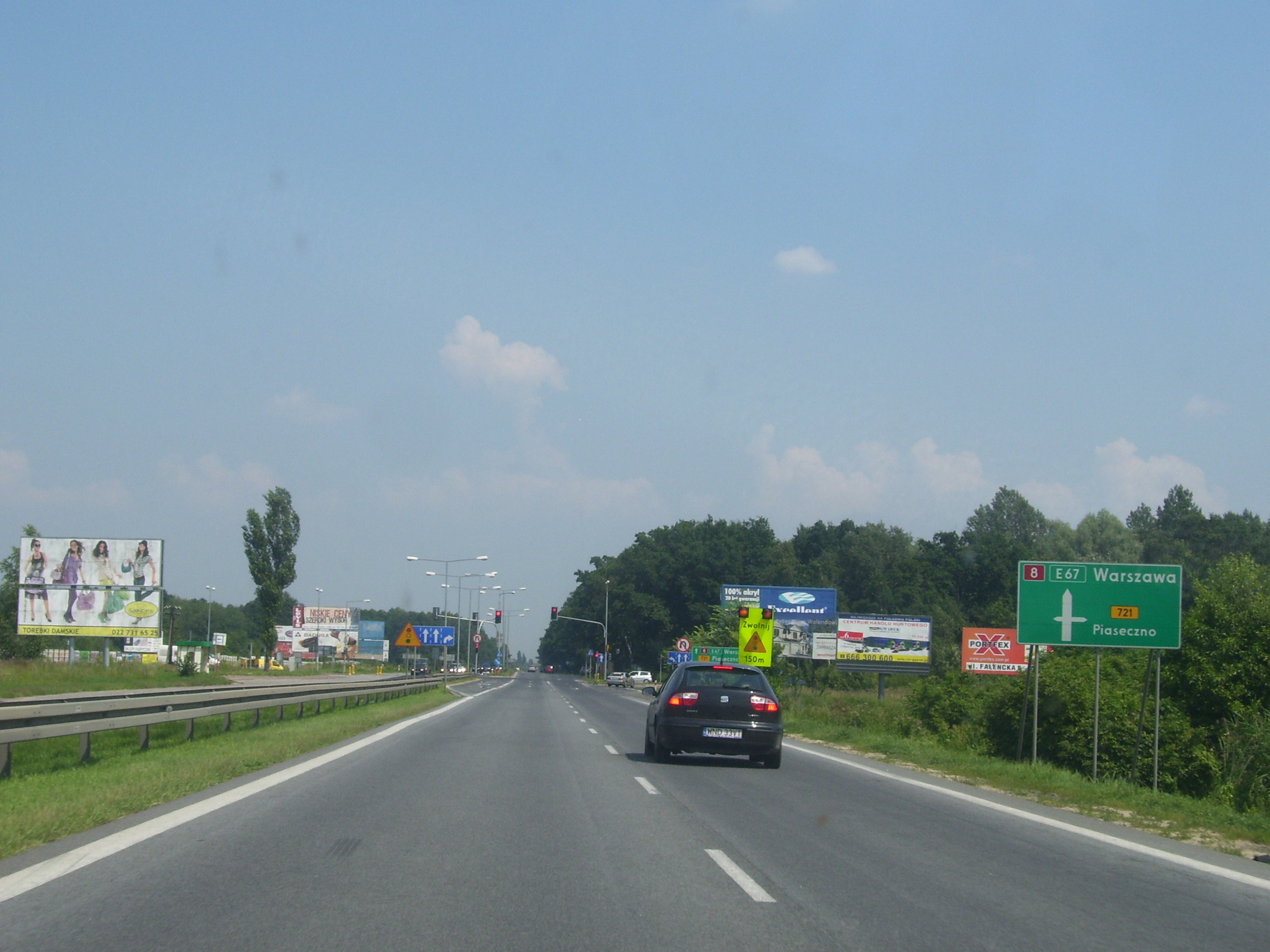
Intersection with DW 721 near Nadarzyn

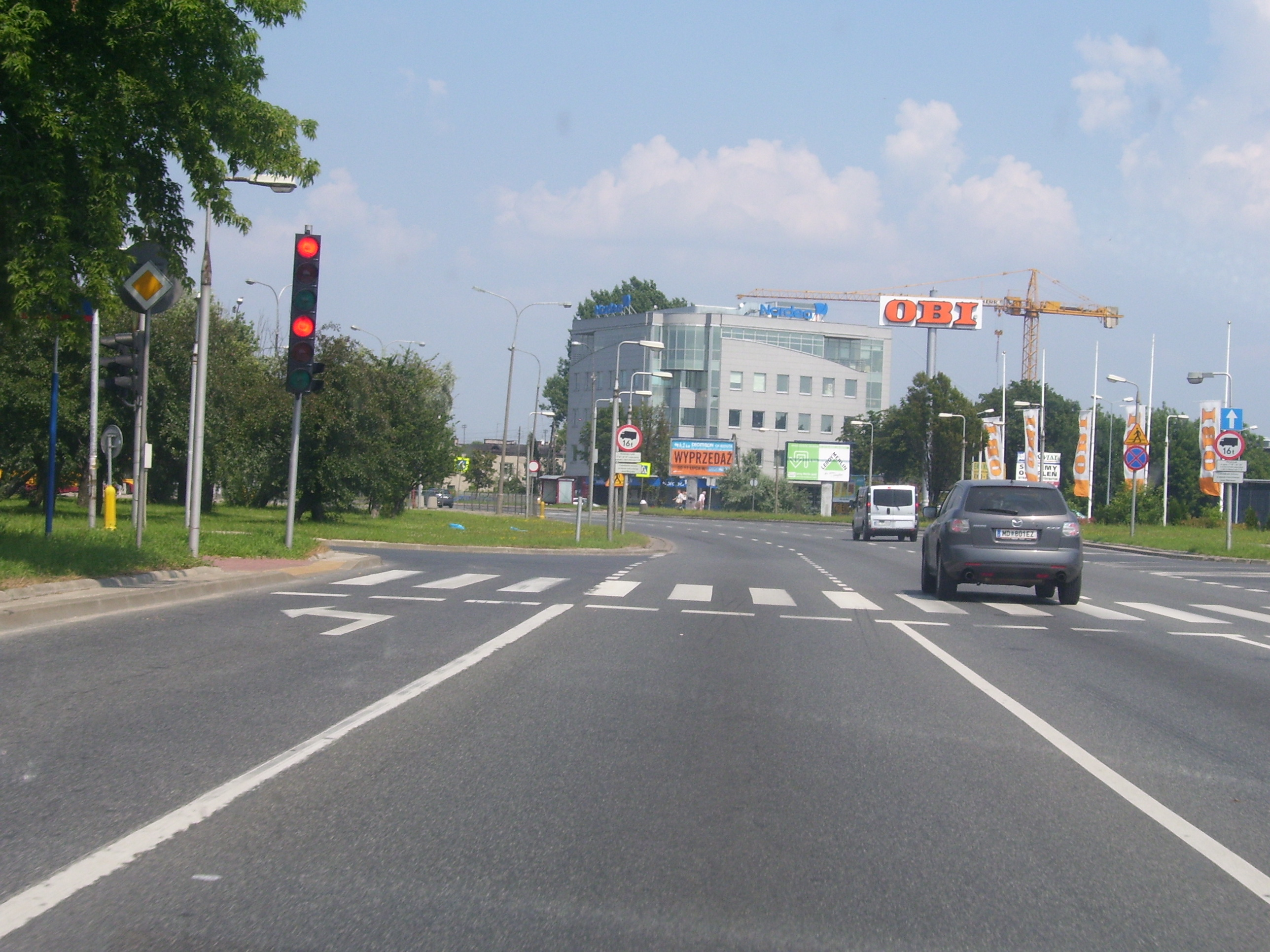
National road 7 and 8 in Warsaw

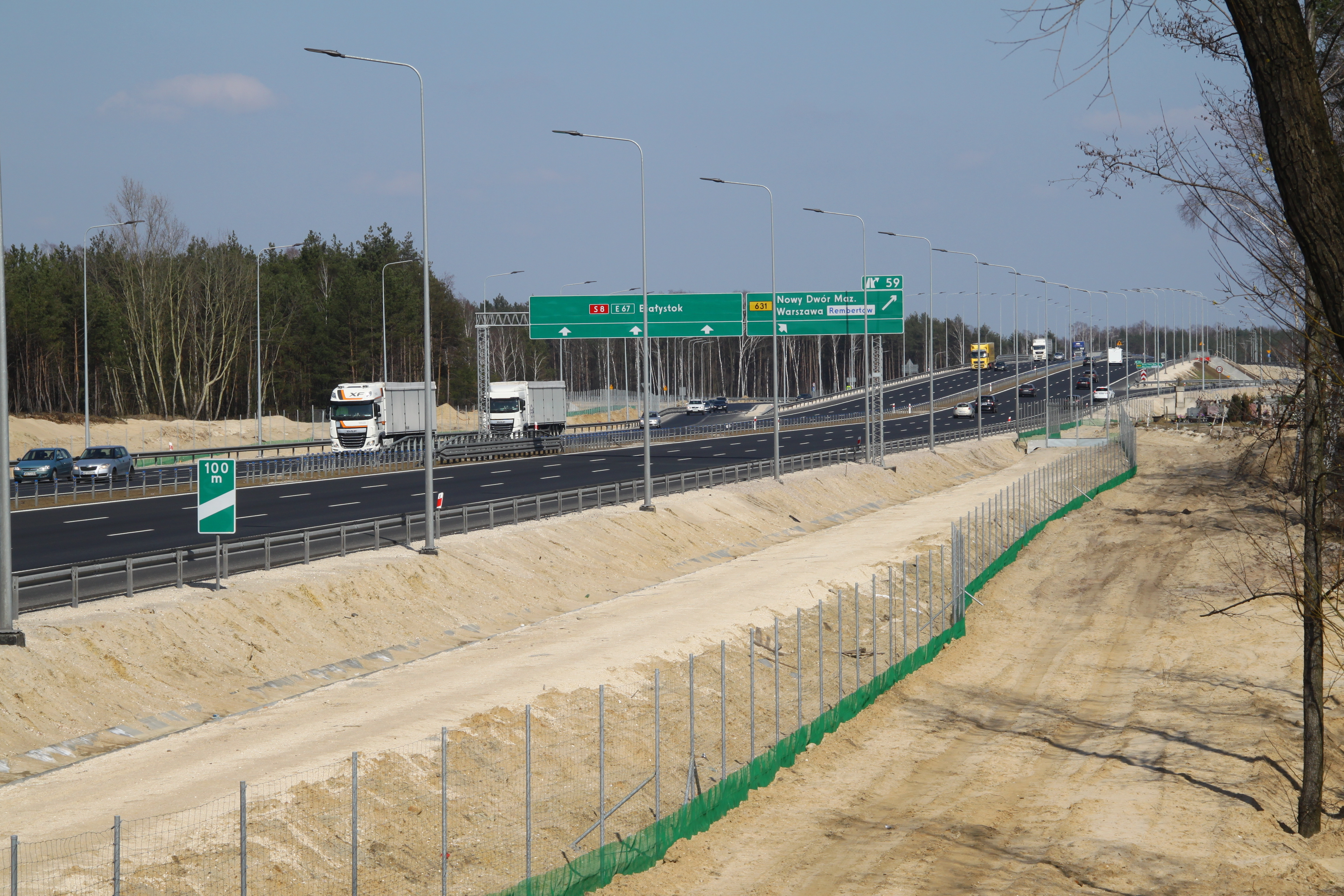
Bypass of Marki in Zielonka

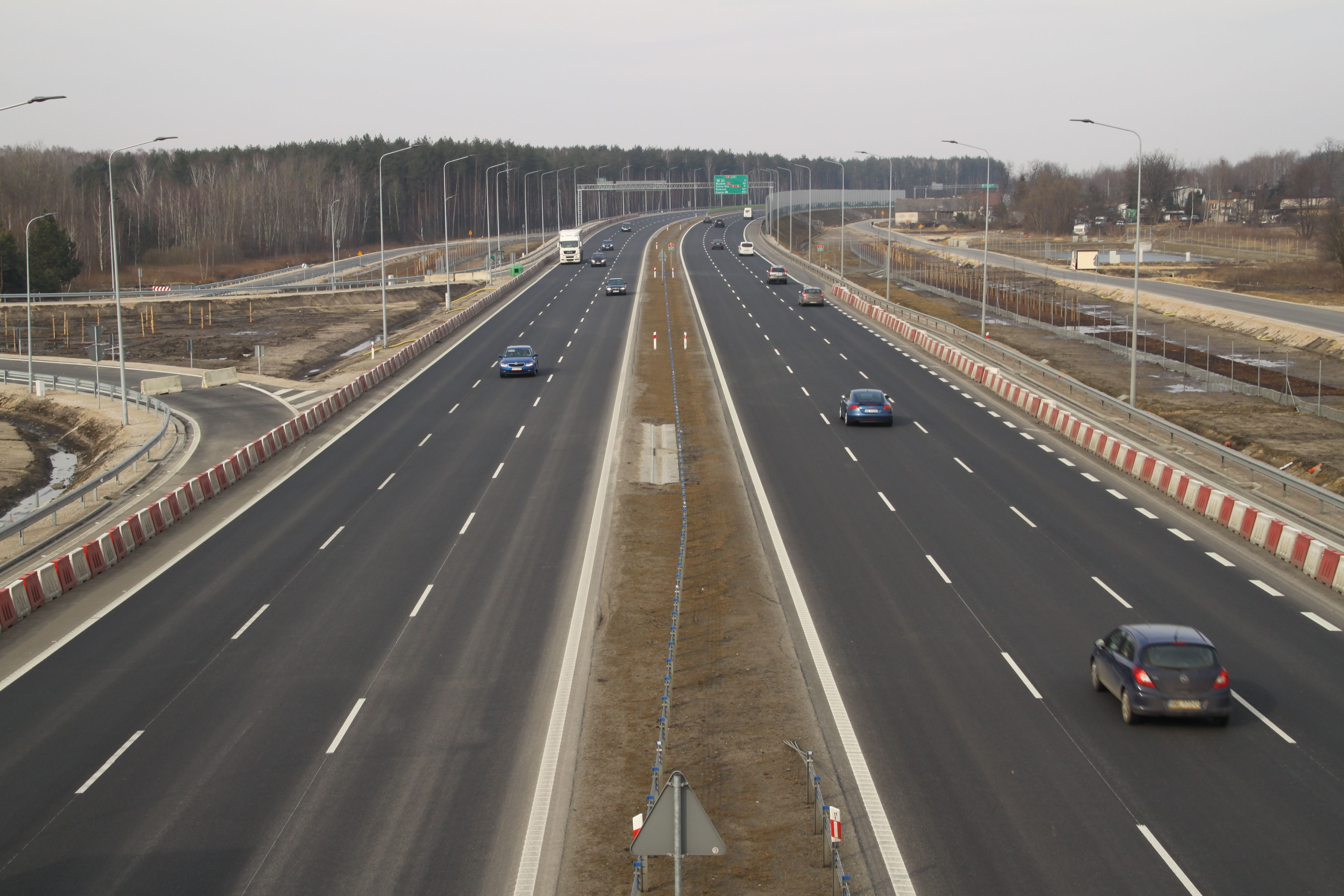
Bypass of Marki in Wołomin

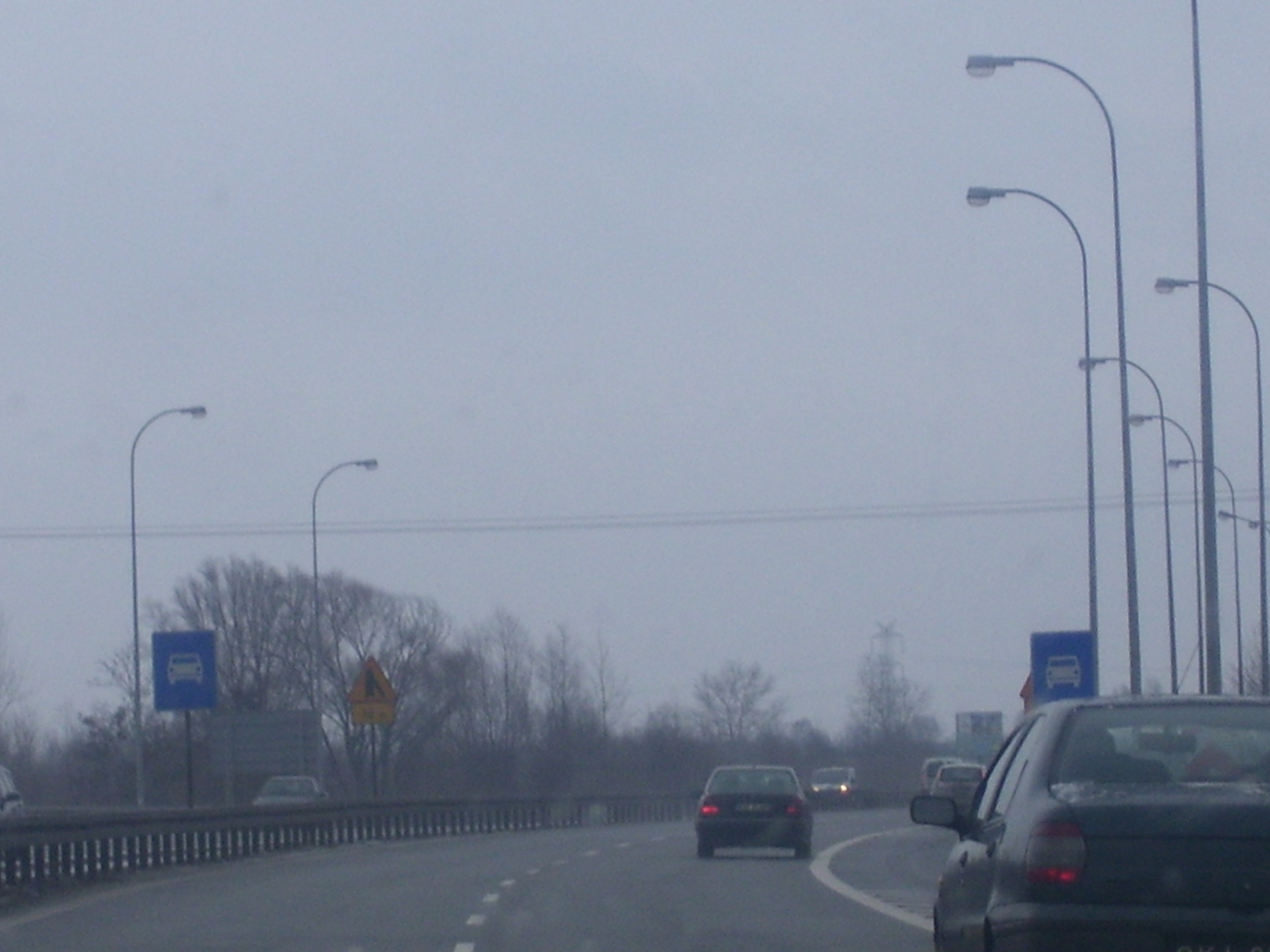
Bypass of Radzymin

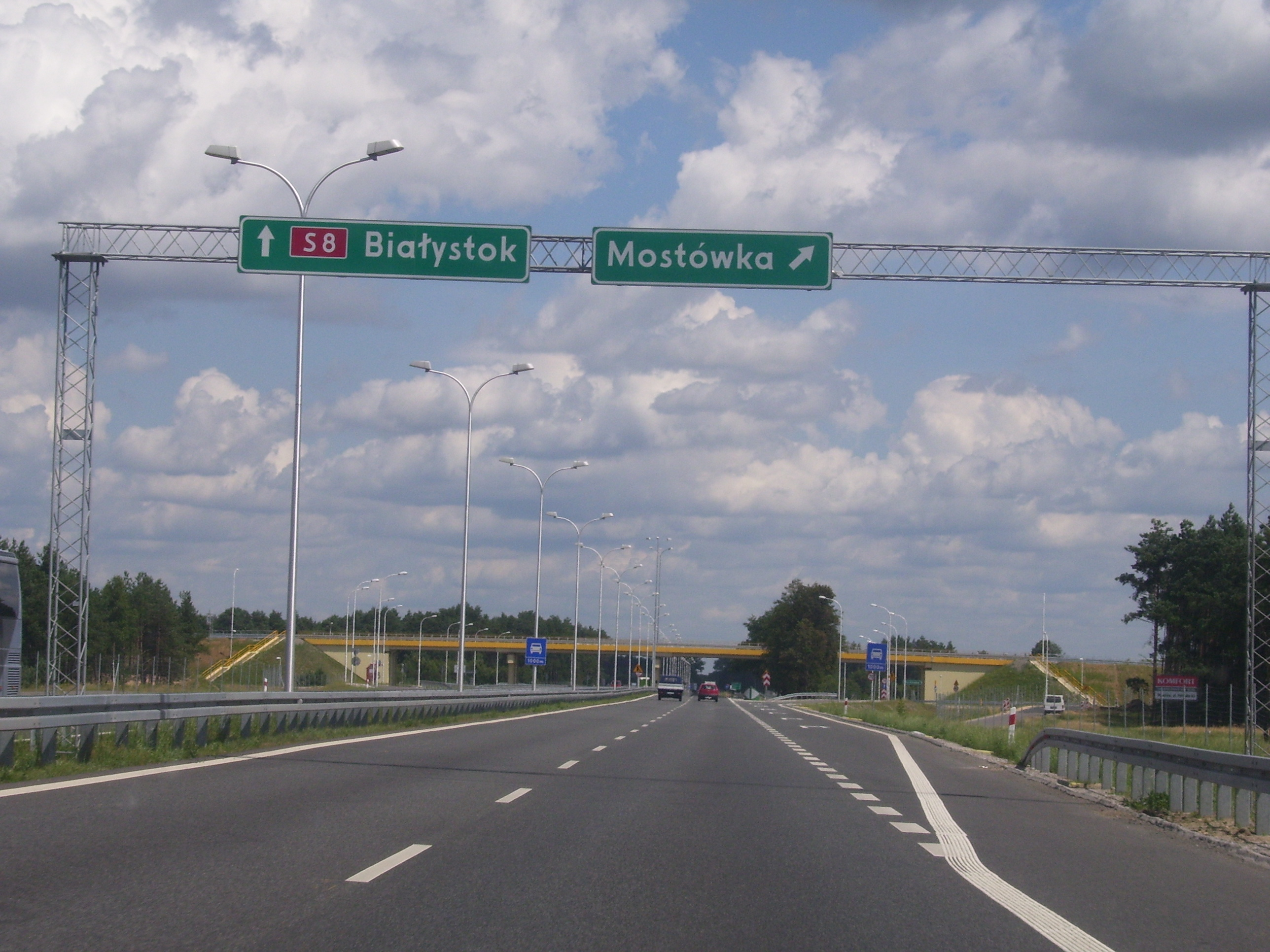
"Mostówka" interchange on S 8

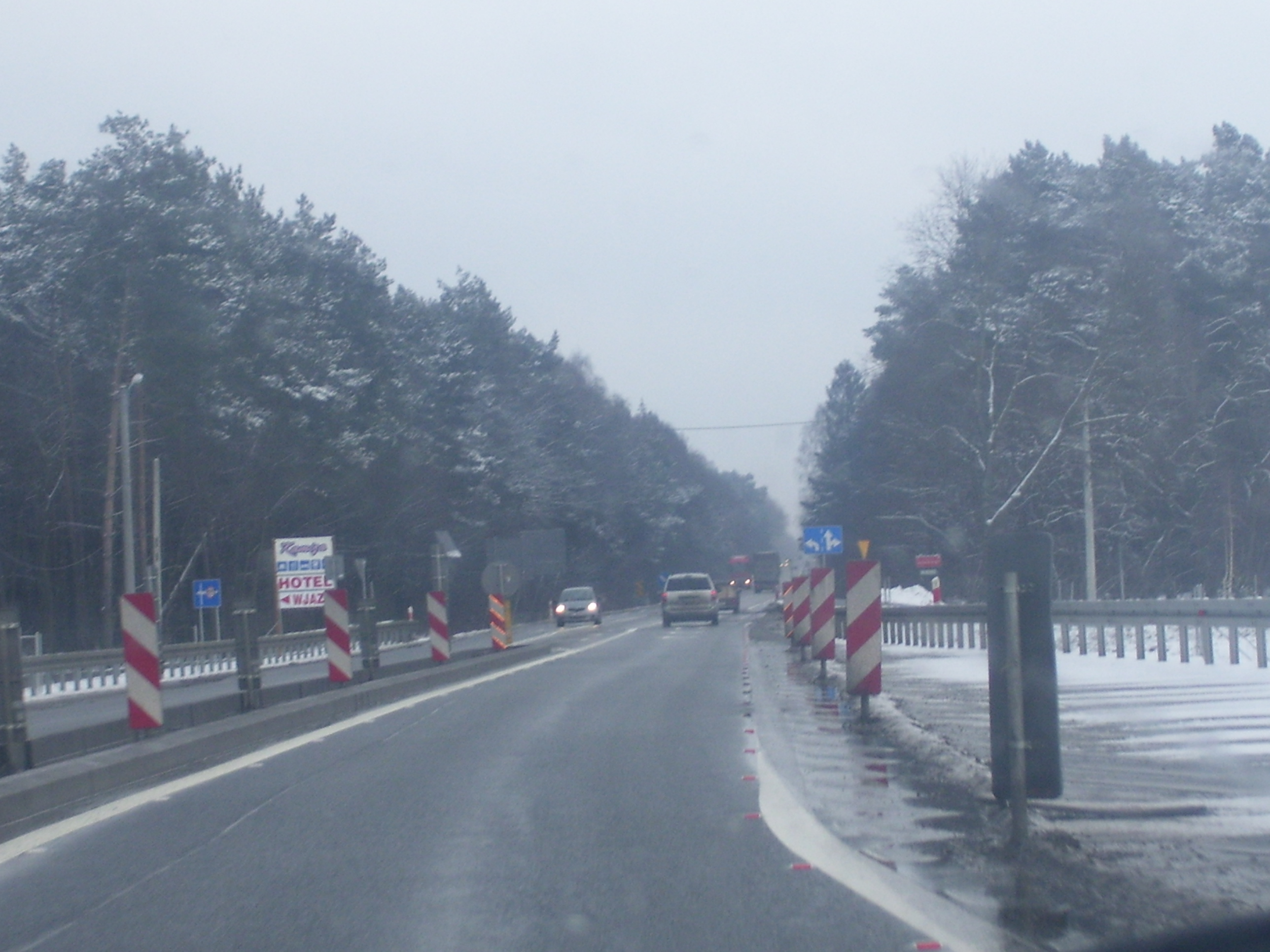
Bypass of Wyszków

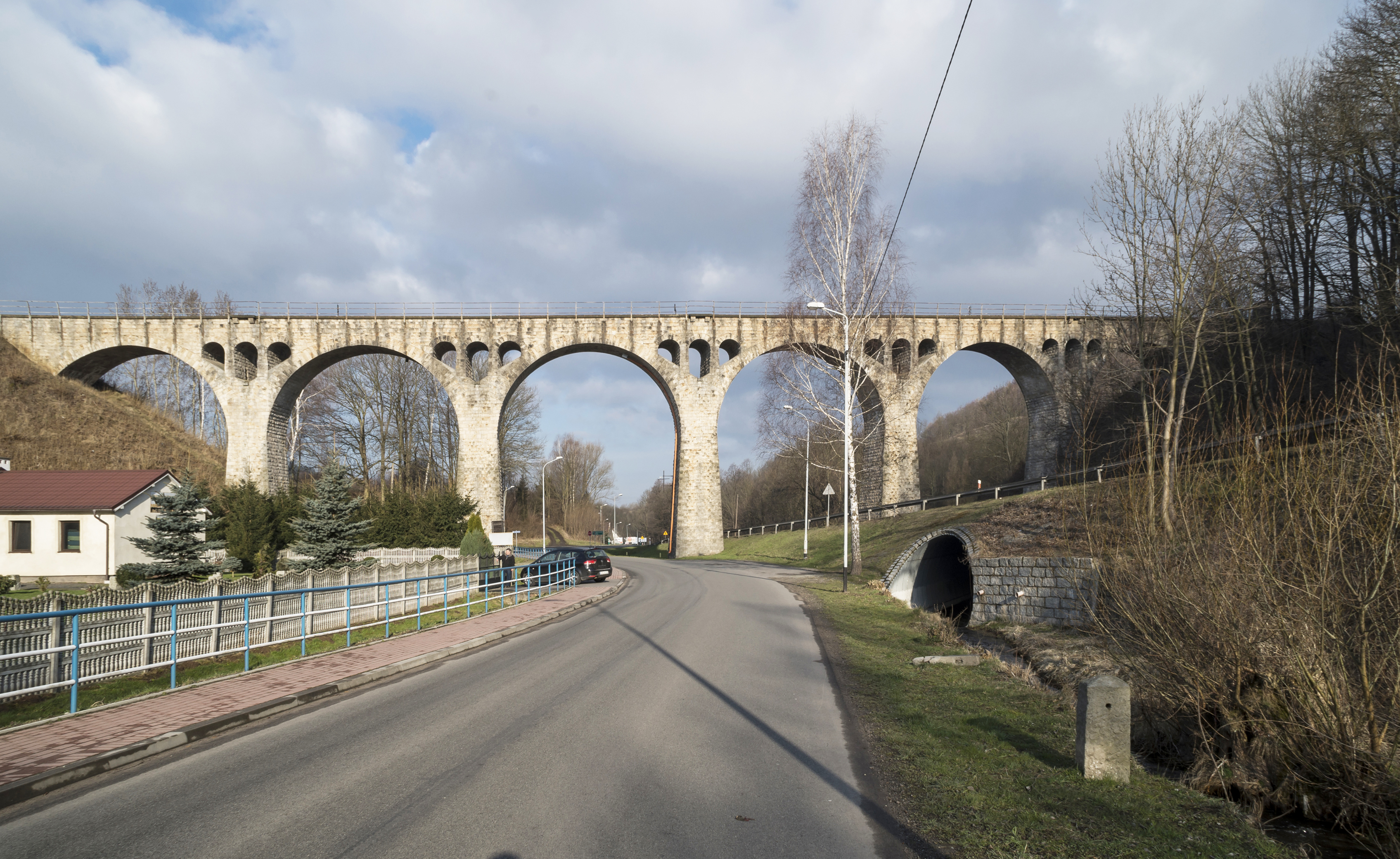
Railway viaduct in Lewin Kłodzki
