= Rudniki =

Rudniki may refer to:

- Rudniki, Gdańsk, a district of the city of Gdańsk, Poland
- Rudniki, Greater Poland Voivodeship (west-central Poland)
- Rudniki, Łęczyca County in Łódź Voivodeship (central Poland)
- Rudniki, Poddębice County in Łódź Voivodeship (central Poland)
- Rudniki, Lublin Voivodeship (east Poland)
- Rudniki, Sokołów County in Masovian Voivodeship (east-central Poland)
- Rudniki, Wołomin County in Masovian Voivodeship (east-central Poland)
- Rudniki, Opole Voivodeship (south-west Poland)
- Rudniki, Białystok County in Podlaskie Voivodeship (north-east Poland)
- Rudniki, Suwałki County in Podlaskie Voivodeship (north-east Poland)
- Rudniki, Bytów County in Pomeranian Voivodeship (north Poland)
- Rudniki, Człuchów County in Pomeranian Voivodeship (north Poland)
- Rudniki, Kwidzyn County in Pomeranian Voivodeship (north Poland)
- Rudniki, Gmina Koniecpol in Silesian Voivodeship (south Poland)
- Rudniki, Gmina Rędziny in Silesian Voivodeship (south Poland)
- Rudniki, Zawiercie County in Silesian Voivodeship (south Poland)
- Rudniki, Kielce County in Świętokrzyskie Voivodeship (south-central Poland)
- Rudniki, Opatów County in Świętokrzyskie Voivodeship (south-central Poland)
- Rudniki, Staszów County in Świętokrzyskie Voivodeship (south-central Poland)
- Rudniki, Warmian-Masurian Voivodeship (north Poland)
- Rudniki, West Pomeranian Voivodeship (north-west Poland)
- Rudnyky, Lviv Oblast
- Rudnyky, Ternopil Oblast
