= Jaski =

Jaski may refer to the following places in Poland:

- Jaski, Lublin Voivodeship
- Jaski, Podlaskie Voivodeship
- Jaśki, Podlaskie Voivodeship
- Jaśki, Warmian-Masurian Voivodeship
