= Sidory, Gmina Raczki =

Sidory
- Village
- Location within Poland
- Coordinates: 54°01′37″N 22°46′05″E
- Country: Poland
- Voivodeship: Podlaskie
- County: Suwałki
- Gmina: Raczki

Sidory [ɕiˈdɔrɨ] is a village in the administrative district of Gmina Raczki, within Suwałki County, Podlaskie Voivodeship, in north-eastern Poland.
