= Jankielówka =

- Village
- Location within Poland
- Coordinates: 53°58′N 22°46′E
- Country: Poland
- Voivodeship: Podlaskie
- County: Suwałki
- Gmina: Raczki

Jankielówka [jankʲɛˈlufka] is a village in the administrative district of Gmina Raczki, within Suwałki County, Podlaskie Voivodeship, in north-eastern Poland.
