= Ziółkowo, Podlaskie Voivodeship =

Ziółkowo
- Village
- Location within Poland
- Coordinates: 53°56′24″N 22°45′50″E
- Country: Poland
- Voivodeship: Podlaskie
- County: Suwałki
- Gmina: Raczki

Ziółkowo ([ʑuu̯ˈkɔvɔ]; Lithuanian: Ziulkovas) is a village in the administrative district of Gmina Raczki, within Suwałki County, Podlaskie Voivodeship, in north-eastern Poland.
