= Wasilówka, Suwałki County =

Wasilówka
- Village
- Location within Poland
- Coordinates: 53°59′40″N 22°41′57″E
- Country: Poland
- Voivodeship: Podlaskie
- County: Suwałki
- Gmina: Raczki

Wasilówka [vaɕiˈlufka] is a village in the administrative district of Gmina Raczki, within Suwałki County, Podlaskie Voivodeship, in north-eastern Poland.
