= Stoki, Podlaskie Voivodeship =

Stoki
- Village
- Location within Poland
- Coordinates: 53°59′N 22°51′E
- Country: Poland
- Voivodeship: Podlaskie
- County: Suwałki
- Gmina: Raczki

Stoki [ˈstɔki] is a village in the administrative district of Gmina Raczki, within Suwałki County, Podlaskie Voivodeship, in north-eastern Poland.
