= Ludwinowo, Suwałki County =

Ludwinowo
- Village
- Location within Poland
- Coordinates: 54°00′46″N 22°43′28″E
- Country: Poland
- Voivodeship: Podlaskie
- County: Suwałki
- Gmina: Raczki

Ludwinowo [ludviˈnɔvɔ] is a village in the administrative district of Gmina Raczki, within Suwałki County, Podlaskie Voivodeship, in north-eastern Poland.
