= Chodźki =

- Village
- Location within Poland
- Coordinates: 54°0′40″N 22°46′29″E
- Country: Poland
- Voivodeship: Podlaskie
- County: Suwałki
- Gmina: Raczki
- Population: 170

Chodźki ([ˈxɔt͡ɕki]; Lithuanian: Chodžkai) is a village in the administrative district of Gmina Raczki, within Suwałki County, Podlaskie Voivodeship, in north-eastern Poland.
