= Lipowo, Gmina Raczki =

Lipowo
- Village
- Location within Poland
- Coordinates: 54°1′56″N 22°46′41″E
- Country: Poland
- Voivodeship: Podlaskie
- County: Suwałki
- Gmina: Raczki

Lipowo [liˈpɔvɔ] is a village in the administrative district of Gmina Raczki, within Suwałki County, Podlaskie Voivodeship, in north-eastern Poland.
