= Małe Raczki =

- Village
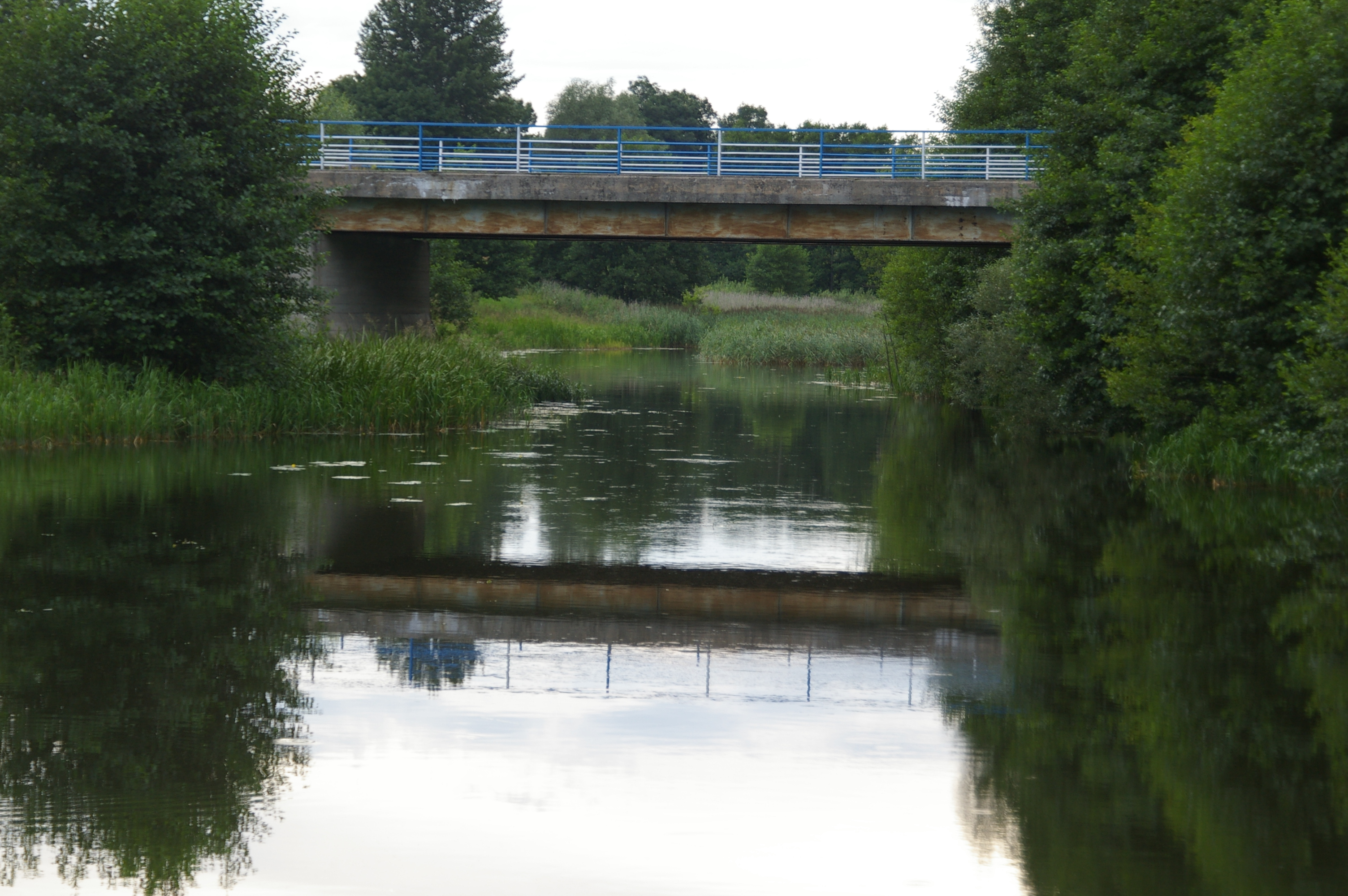
- Bridge in Małe Raczki

- Location within Poland
- Coordinates: 54°00′27″N 22°45′02″E
- Country: Poland
- Voivodeship: Podlaskie
- County: Suwałki
- Gmina: Raczki

Małe Raczki [ˈmawɛ ˈrat͡ʂki] is a village in the administrative district of Gmina Raczki. It is within Suwałki County, Podlaskie Voivodeship, in north-eastern Poland.
