= Wronowo, Podlaskie Voivodeship =

Wronowo
- Village
- Location within Poland
- Coordinates: 53°57′3″N 22°48′6″E
- Country: Poland
- Voivodeship: Podlaskie
- County: Suwałki
- Gmina: Raczki
- Population: 160

Wronowo [vrɔˈnɔvɔ] is a village in the administrative district of Gmina Raczki, within Suwałki County, Podlaskie Voivodeship, in north-eastern Poland.
