= Lipówka, Podlaskie Voivodeship =

Lipówka
- Village
- Location within Poland
- Coordinates: 53°58′15″N 22°42′32″E
- Country: Poland
- Voivodeship: Podlaskie
- County: Suwałki
- Gmina: Raczki
- Postal code: 16-420
- Vehicle registration: BSU

Lipówka [liˈpufka] is a village in the administrative district of Gmina Raczki, within Suwałki County, Podlaskie Voivodeship, in north-eastern Poland.

Five Polish citizens were murdered by Nazi Germany in the village during World War II.
