= Kurianki Pierwsze =

- Village
- Location within Poland
- Coordinates: 53°58′32″N 22°50′53″E
- Country: Poland
- Voivodeship: Podlaskie
- County: Suwałki
- Gmina: Raczki

Kurianki Pierwsze [kuˈrjanki ˈpjɛrfʂɛ] is a village in the administrative district of Gmina Raczki, within Suwałki County, Podlaskie Voivodeship, in north-eastern Poland.
