= Gmina Raczki =

Gmina Raczki Raczki Commune
- Gmina
- Coat of arms

- Gmina Raczki within the Suwałki County
- Coordinates (Raczki): 53°59′N 22°47′E
- Country: Poland
- Voivodeship: Podlaskie
- County: Suwałki County
- Seat: Raczki

Area
  - Total: 142.25 km^{2} (54.92 sq mi)

Population (2006)
  - Total: 6,137
  - Density: 43.14/km^{2} (111.7/sq mi)
- Website: http://www.raczki.pl

Gmina Raczki is a rural gmina (administrative district) in Suwałki County, Podlaskie Voivodeship, in north-eastern Poland. Its seat is the village of Raczki, which lies approximately 15 kilometres (9 mi) south-west of Suwałki and 100 km (62 mi) north of the regional capital Białystok.

The gmina covers an area of 142.25 square kilometres (54.9 sq mi), and as of 2006 its total population is 6,137.

== Villages ==
Gmina Raczki contains the villages and settlements of Bakaniuk, Bolesty, Chodźki, Dowspuda, Franciszkowo, Jankielówka, Jaśki, Józefowo, Koniecbór, Korytki, Krukówek, Kurianki Drugie, Kurianki Pierwsze, Lipówka, Lipowo, Ludwinowo, Małe Raczki, Moczydły, Planta, Podwysokie, Rabalina, Raczki, Rudniki, Sidory, Słoboda, Stoki, Sucha Wieś, Szczodruchy, Szkocja, Wasilówka, Wierciochy, Witówka, Wronowo, Wysokie, Ziółkowo and Żubrynek.

== Neighbouring gminas ==
Gmina Raczki is bordered by the gminas of Augustów, Bakałarzewo, Kalinowo, Nowinka, Suwałki and Wieliczki.
