= Franciszkowo, Podlaskie Voivodeship =

Franciszkowo
- Village
- Location within Poland
- Coordinates: 54°2′N 22°53′E
- Country: Poland
- Voivodeship: Podlaskie
- County: Suwałki
- Gmina: Raczki

Franciszkowo [frant͡ɕiʂˈkɔvɔ] is a village in the administrative district of Gmina Raczki, within Suwałki County, Podlaskie Voivodeship, in north-eastern Poland.
