= Krukówek =

- Village
- Location within Poland
- Coordinates: 54°2′N 22°49′E
- Country: Poland
- Voivodeship: Podlaskie
- County: Suwałki
- Gmina: Raczki
- Population: 67

Krukówek [kruˈkuvɛk] is a village in the administrative district of Gmina Raczki, within Suwałki County, Podlaskie Voivodeship in north-eastern Poland.
