= Sucha Wieś =

- Village
- Location within Poland
- Coordinates: 53°57′N 22°50′E
- Country: Poland
- Voivodeship: Podlaskie
- County: Suwałki
- Gmina: Raczki

Sucha Wieś [ˈsuxa ˈvjɛɕ] is a village in the administrative district of Gmina Raczki, within Suwałki County, Podlaskie Voivodeship, in north-eastern Poland.
