= Szczodruchy, Suwałki County =

Szczodruchy
- Village
- Location within Poland
- Coordinates: 54°2′N 22°41′E
- Country: Poland
- Voivodeship: Podlaskie
- County: Suwałki
- Gmina: Raczki

Szczodruchy [ʂt͡ʂɔˈdruxɨ] is a village in the administrative district of Gmina Raczki, within Suwałki County, Podlaskie Voivodeship, in north-eastern Poland.
