= Koniecbór =

- Village
- Location within Poland
- Coordinates: 54°1′N 22°50′E
- Country: Poland
- Voivodeship: Podlaskie
- County: Suwałki
- Gmina: Raczki
- Population: 158

Koniecbór [kɔˈɲɛt͡sbur] is a village in the administrative district of Gmina Raczki, within Suwałki County, Podlaskie Voivodeship, in north-eastern Poland.

In 2005 the village had a population of 158.
