= Korytki, Suwałki County =

Korytki
- Village
- Location within Poland
- Coordinates: 53°56′00″N 22°46′12″E
- Country: Poland
- Voivodeship: Podlaskie
- County: Suwałki
- Gmina: Raczki

Korytki [kɔˈrɨtki] is a village in the administrative district of Gmina Raczki, within Suwałki County, Podlaskie Voivodeship, in north-eastern Poland.
