= Podwysokie, Podlaskie Voivodeship =

Podwysokie
- Village
- Location within Poland
- Coordinates: 54°03′03″N 22°45′34″E
- Country: Poland
- Voivodeship: lubelskie
- County: Zamość
- Gmina: Skierbieszów

Podwysokie [pɔdvɨˈsɔkʲɛ] is a village in the administrative district of Gmina Skierbieszów, within Zamość County, Lubelskie Voivodeship, in south-eastern Poland.
