= Expressway S8 (Poland) =

Expressway in Poland connecting Białystok, Warsaw, Łódź and Wrocław

Expressway S8
- Droga ekspresowa S8

Route information
- Part of E67
- Length: 554.4 km (344.5 mi)

Major junctions
- West end: A4 near Wrocław
- S5 near Wrocław; S11 near Kępno S14 near Pabianice; A1 near Łódź; A2 and S7 near Warsaw S61 near Ostrów Mazowiecka
- East end: S19 near Białystok

Location
- Country: Poland
- Major cities: Wrocław, Łódź, Warsaw, Białystok

Highway system
- National roads in Poland; Voivodeship roads
← S 7	→ S 10

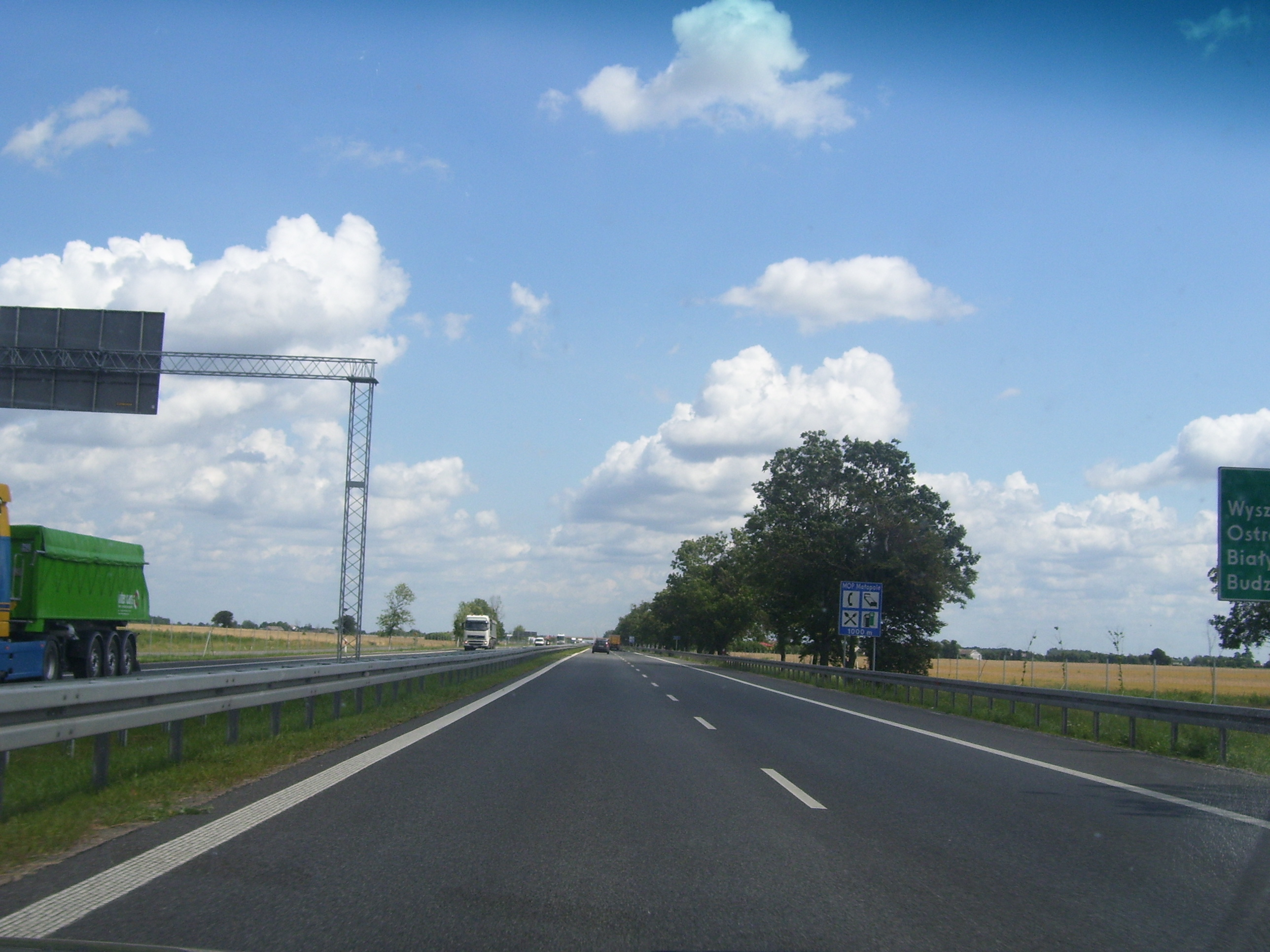
S8 between Radzymin and Wyszków

Expressway S8 or express road S8, officially named The Route of the Heroes of the Battle of Warsaw 1920 (pl. droga ekspresowa S8, Trasa Bohaterów Bitwy Warszawskiej 1920 r.) is a Polish highway which connects Wrocław via Łódź and Warsaw to Białystok. The whole road is 554 km (344 mi) long. Its fragment forming the bypass of Wrocław (22.7 km) is constructed in motorway standard and marked as A8.

The road was constructed between 2008 and 2019 (short fragments serving as town bypasses had been constructed earlier). The construction was co-funded by the European Union.

In 2019, it was announced that an extension of S8 from Wrocław to Kłodzko was added to the plans. Its main part is planned to be opened by 2028. In 2022, it was announced that there are plans for extending the road further from Kłodzko to the Czech–Polish border in Boboszów which is intended to be constructed by 2033, however in the Czech Republic there is so far no planned expressway that would connect to it.

== Route ==
Section	Opening dates	Notes
Boboszów( (Poland) / (Czech Republic) ) – Kłodzko – Bardo	planned 2033	
Bardo – Wrocław (A4)	planned 2028	
Wrocław bypass	2010 – 2011	Motorway
Wrocław – Łódź (A1)	2012 – 2014	Bypass of Oleśnica was opened in 2006
Piotrków Trybunalski (A1) – Warsaw (S2/S7)	2012 – 2019	Constructed as an upgrade of a dual-carriageway national road from the 1970s
Warsaw city section	2010 – 2015	Constructed mostly as an upgrade of the existing inner-city highway; partially concurrent with S2 & S7
Warsaw – Białystok (S19)	2008 – 2018	Bypass of Ostrów Mazowiecka was opened in 2003

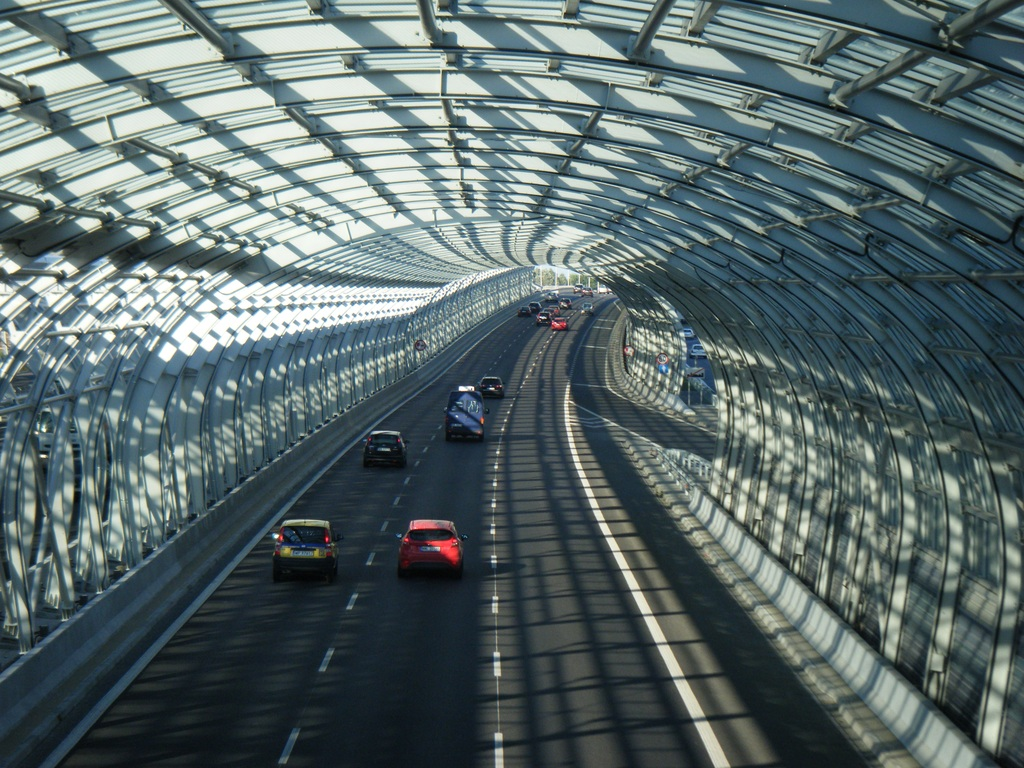
S8 in Warsaw

== S8 in Warsaw ==
S8 route in Warsaw

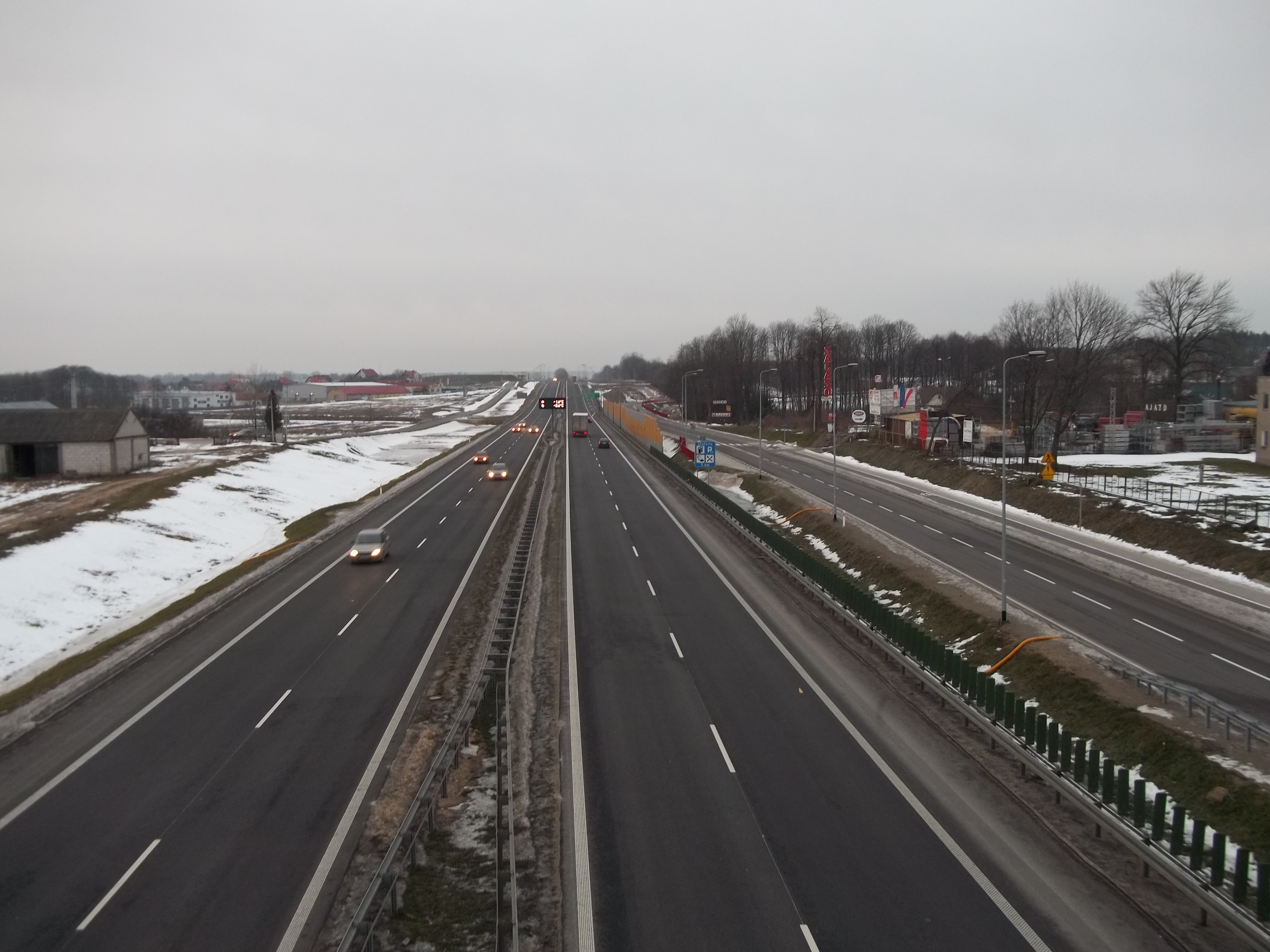
S8 in Choroszcz

S8 runs through Warsaw and is part of its network of bypass roads. Various fragments were completed between 2010 and 2015. It was constructed mostly as an upgrade of the city's existing inner highways. As such, it might be considered not to fully meet the definition of a bypass as it serves both the transit and local district traffic at the same time. In effect, large traffic jams form on this section every day in the peak hours. In the most recent general traffic measurement conducted in 2020 and 2021, S8 in Warsaw recorded the annual average daily traffic of 198'000 vehicles, making it the most busy highway section in Poland.

During rush hours (7-10 and 16–20), the road is closed for truck drivers, who have to bypass the city area through expressway S2 and road 50 (south-east of Warsaw), or through roads 50 and 62 (north-west of Warsaw).

== Via Baltica ==
Originally, S8 was planned to continue from Białystok to the border with Lithuania. In 2009, the plans were changed and instead S61 now branches off S8 and follows a more direct route to the border. S61 and the section of S8 from Warsaw to the S61's starting point serve as part of Via Baltica.

== See also ==
- Highways in Poland
- European route E67
