= Wysokie, Gmina Raczki =

Wysokie
- Village
- Location within Poland
- Coordinates: 53°55′58″N 22°47′50″E
- Country: Poland
- Voivodeship: Podlaskie
- County: Suwałki
- Gmina: Raczki

Wysokie [vɨˈsɔkʲɛ] is a village in the administrative district of Gmina Raczki, within Suwałki County, Podlaskie Voivodeship, in north-eastern Poland.
