= Budzisko =

- Village
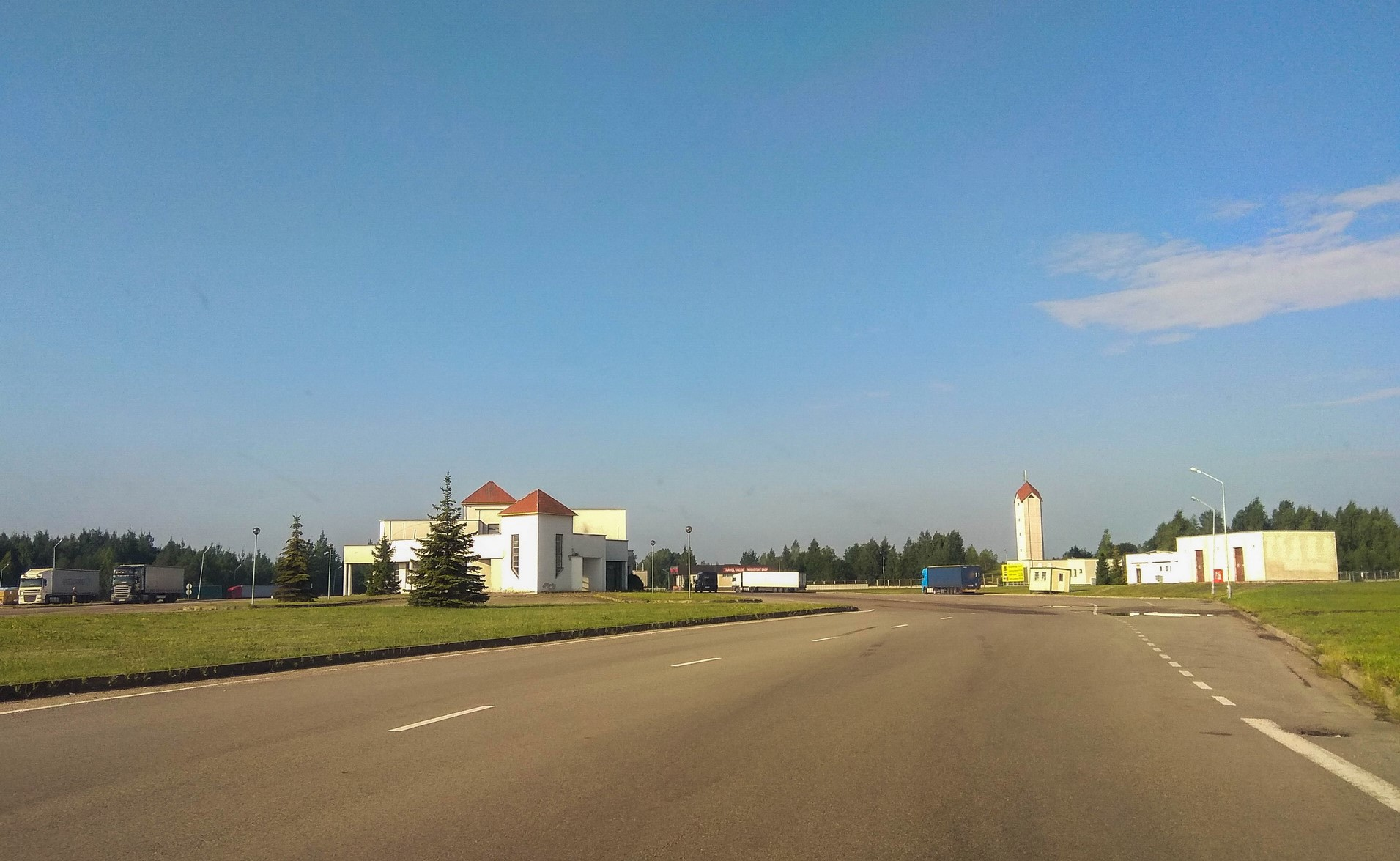

- Location within Poland
- Coordinates: 54°18′N 23°6′E
- Country: Poland
- Voivodeship: Podlaskie
- County: Suwałki
- Gmina: Szypliszki
- Time zone: UTC+1 (CET)
  - Summer (DST): UTC+2 (CEST)
- Vehicle registration: BSU

Budzisko ([buˈd͡ʑiskɔ]; Lithuanian: Budziskas) is a village in the administrative district of Gmina Szypliszki, within Suwałki County, Podlaskie Voivodeship, in north-eastern Poland, close to the border with Lithuania.

== History ==
The village belonged to the Grand Duchy of Lithuania and the Polish–Lithuanian Commonwealth from the 13th century until 1795.

According to the 1921 Polish census, 45 people lived in the village: 36 Lithuanians and 9 Poles.

== See also ==
- Suwałki Gap

== Sources ==
- GUS (1924). Skorowidz miejscowości Rzeczypospolitej Polskiej: opracowany na podstawie wyników pierwszego powszechnego spisu ludności z dn. 30 września 1921 r. i innych źródeł urzędowych [Index of towns and cities in the Republic of Poland: prepared on the basis of the results of the first general population census of September 30, 1921 and other official sources] (in Polish). Vol. 17: Województwo białostockie. Warsaw: Główny Urząd Statystyczny.
- VLKK (2002). "Atvirkštinis lietuvių kalboje vartojamų tradicinių Lenkijos vietovardžių formų sąrašas" (PDF). VLKK (in Lithuanian).
