= Raczki, Podlaskie Voivodeship =

Raczki
- Village
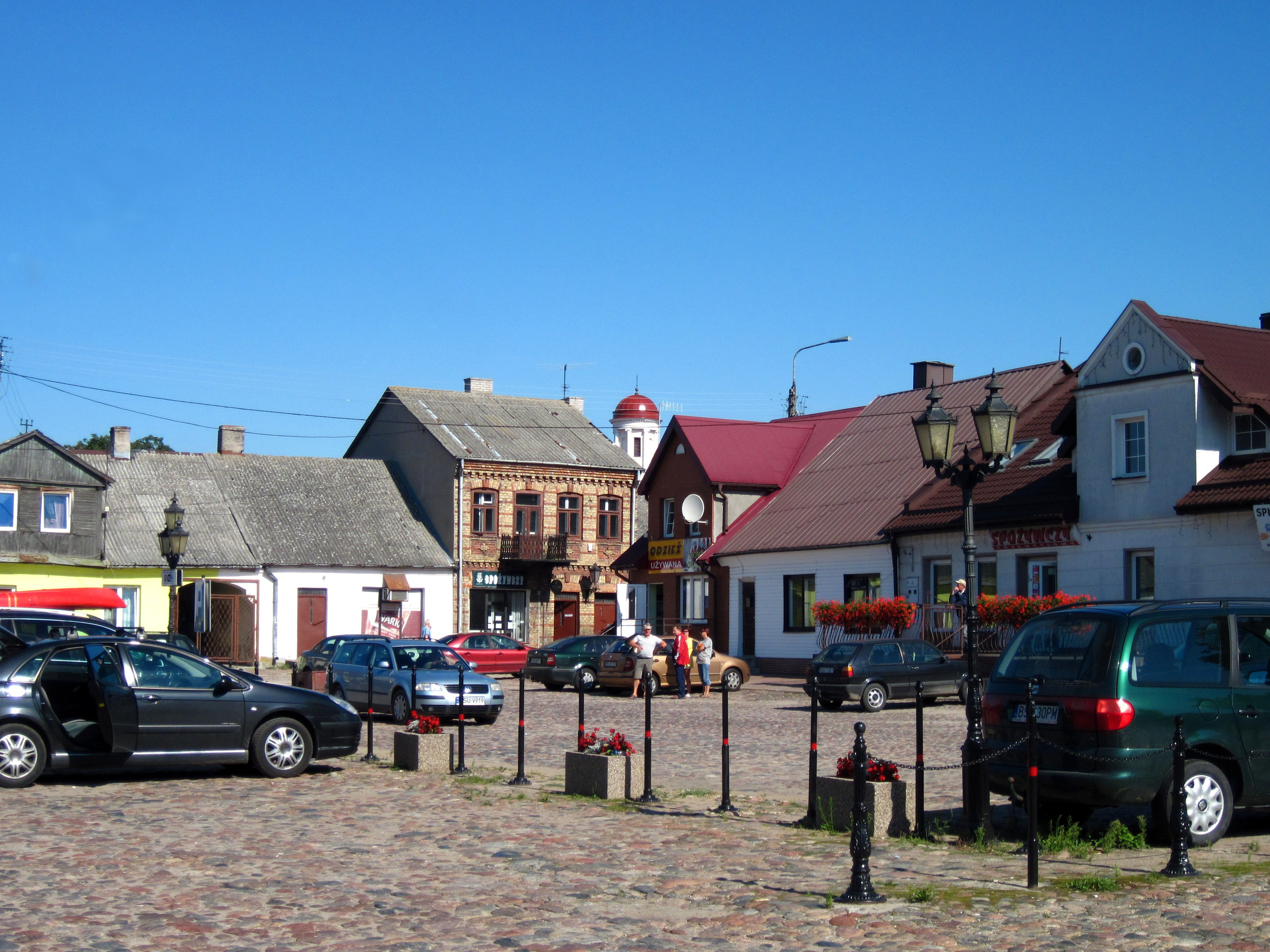
- Market Square in Raczki

- Location within Poland
- Coordinates: 53°59′N 22°47′E
- Country: Poland
- Voivodeship: Podlaskie
- County: Suwałki
- Gmina: Raczki
- Established: 16th century

Population
  - Total: 2,100
- Time zone: UTC+1 (CET)
  - Summer (DST): UTC+2 (CEST)
- Vehicle registration: BSU
- Website: http://www.raczki.pl/

Raczki [ˈrat͡ʂki] (Yiddish: ראַצק, romanized: Rotzk) is a village in Suwałki County, Podlaskie Voivodeship, in north-eastern Poland. It is the seat of the gmina (administrative district) called Gmina Raczki.

== History ==
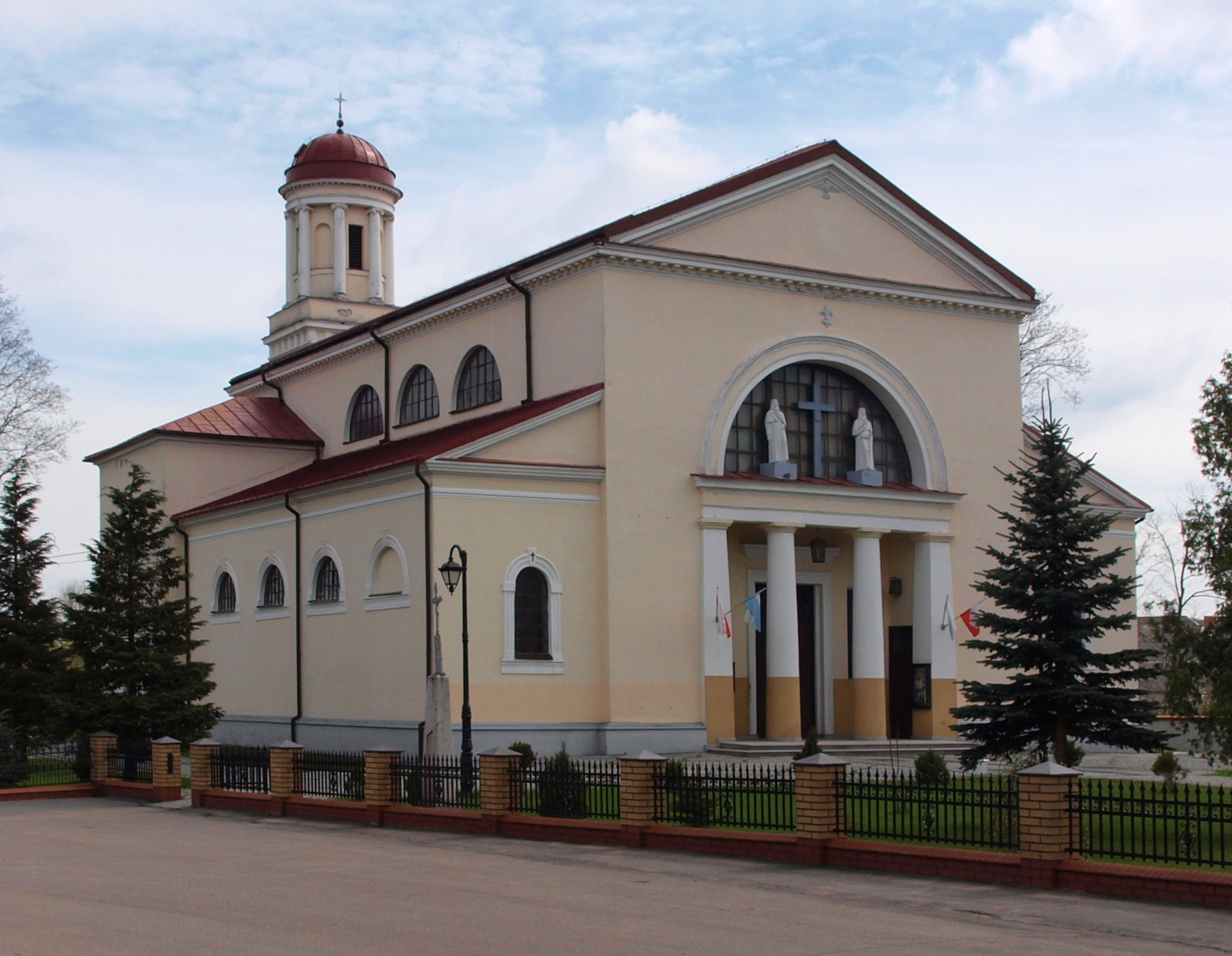
Holy Trinity church

Raczki was founded in the 16th century and was initially named Dowspuda Raczkowska, however, the name was soon changed to Raczki after the local Raczkowicz noble family, owners of the territory. It was granted town rights in 1558 or earlier, as it was mentioned as a town in a document from 1558. In 1682 King John III Sobieski granted trade privileges, and in 1703 King Augustus II the Strong granted (confirmed) town rights. In 1748, Raczki was bought by the Pac family. The Pac family expanded the town, and the family's Gozdawa coat of arms remains the coat of arms of Gmina Raczki.

In the Third Partition of Poland, in 1795, the town was annexed by Prussia, and in 1807 it passed to the newly formed Polish Duchy of Warsaw. After its disestablishment, in 1815, it passed to so-called Congress Poland within the Russian Partition of Poland. Ludwik Michał Pac took an active part in the Polish November Uprising of 1830–1831. After the Polish defeat, he fled from partitioned Poland. As punishment, the Tsarist administration confiscated the town, which then declined. After the massacres of Polish protesters committed by the Russians in Warsaw in 1861, Polish demonstrations and clashes with Russian soldiers took place in Raczki. In 1867 Raczki was deprived of town rights by the Russians, as one of many Polish towns punished for the unsuccessful Polish January Uprising of 1863–1864. After World War I, in 1918, Poland regained independence and control of the settlement. In the interbellum it was part of the Białystok Voivodeship.

Following the joint German-Soviet invasion of Poland, which started World War II in September 1939, Raczki was occupied by Germany. The Polish population was subjected to various crimes. In Raczki, the Germans arrested two Polish priests Czesław Żebrowski and Czesław Chmielewski, and then deported them to concentration camps. Both survived and were liberated in Dachau concentration camp in 1945. The village was heavily devastated during the war.

After German occupation ended, Raczki was restored to Poland, although with a Soviet-installed communist regime, which stayed in power until the Fall of Communism in the 1980s. The Polish anti-communist resistance was active in Raczki, and in 1945 it raided a local communist police station.

== Sports ==
The local football club is Polonia Raczki. It competes in the lower leagues.

== Famous Residents ==
- Jack Yellen (born Jacek Jeleń) (1892-1991), American lyricist and screenwriter and member of the Songwriters Hall of Fame; born in Raczki, emigrated to the US when he was a child
