= Trypucie =

- Village
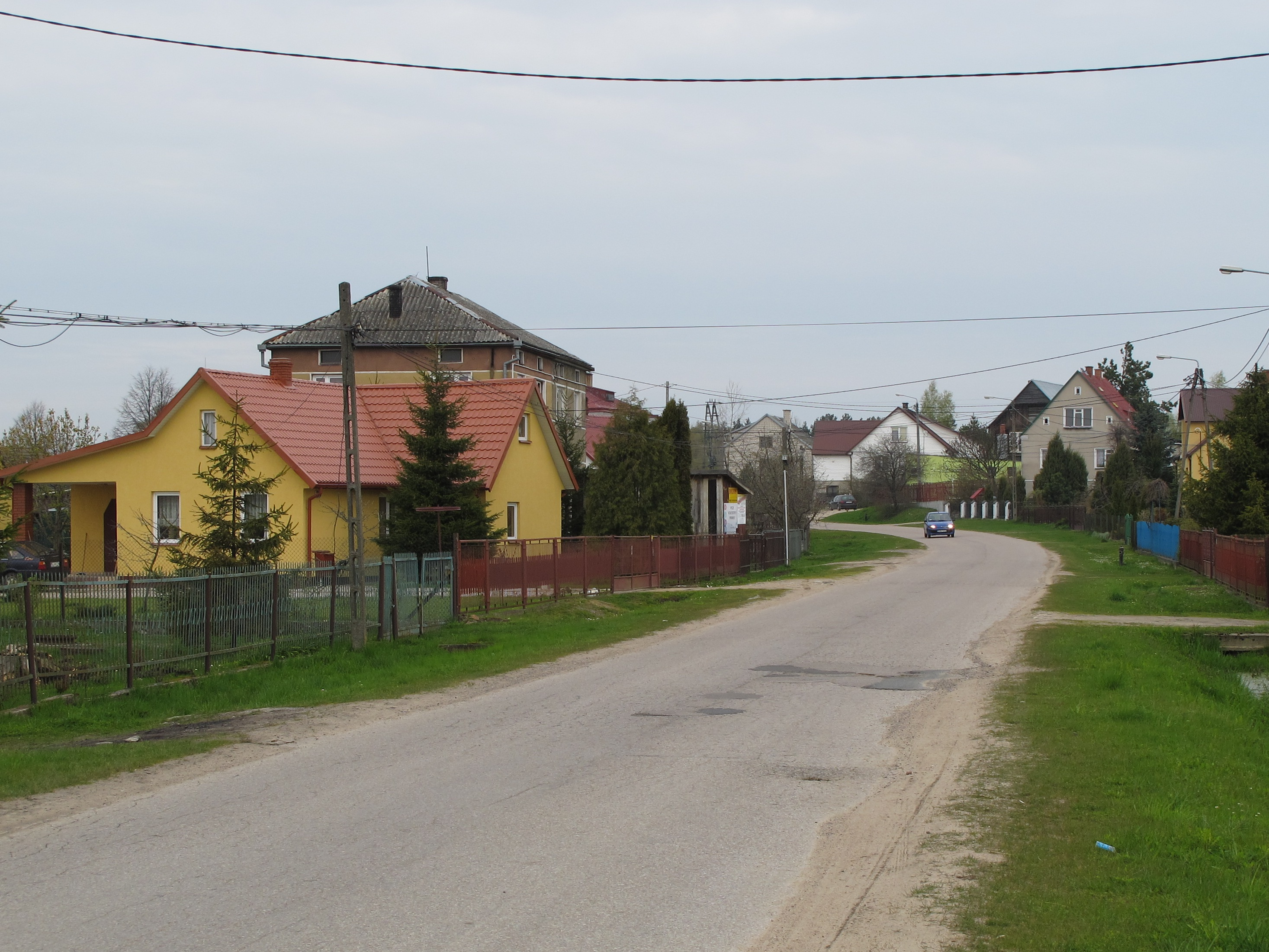

- Location within Poland
- Coordinates: 53°5′N 23°2′E
- Country: Poland
- Voivodeship: Podlaskie
- County: Białystok
- Gmina: Turośń Kościelna
- Population: 300

Trypucie [trɨˈput͡ɕɛ] is a village of 300 people in the administrative district of Gmina Turośń Kościelna, within Białystok County, Podlaskie Voivodeship, in northeastern Poland, approximately 8 km (5 mi) north of Turośń Kościelna and 10 km (6 mi) southwest of the regional capital, Białystok.
