= Dobrowoda =

Dobrowoda may refer to the following places:

- Dobrowoda, Białystok County in Podlaskie Voivodeship (north-east Poland)
- Dobrowoda, Hajnówka County in Podlaskie Voivodeship (north-east Poland)
- Dobrowoda, Świętokrzyskie Voivodeship (south-central Poland)
