= Antoni Beszta-Borowski =

Polish Roman Catholic priest and martyr (1880–1943)

Blessed Antoni Beszta-Borowski
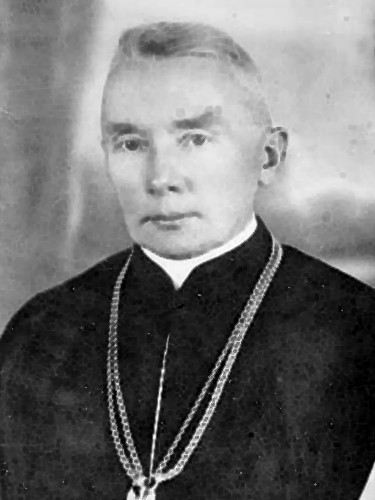
- Beszta-Borowski, c. 1938

Martyr
- Born: 9 September 1880; Borowskie Olki
- Died: 15 July 1943 (aged 62); Pilicki forest (near Bielsk Podlaski)
- Venerated in: Catholic Church
- Beatified: 13 June 1999, Warsaw by Pope John Paul II
- Feast: 12 June; 15 June

Antoni Beszta-Borowski (9 September 1880 – 15 July 1943) was a Polish Roman Catholic priest. He was dean of Bielsk Podlaski. He is one of the 108 Martyrs of World War II.

== Biography ==
Beszta-Borowski was born on 9 September 1880 in Borowskie Olki; his parents, Jan and Michalina (née Średzińska), were members of the szlachta, using the Ślepowron coat of arms. He was baptized on 9 November 1880. Beszta-Borowski was first educated at Suraż and Białystok before being sent to Vilnius, where he entered into the diocesan seminary. He completed his studies in 1904, and was ordained a priest on 17 August 1904 at Vilnius Cathedral by Edward Ropp.

After his ordination, Beszta-Borowski served at the Church of St. Raphael the Archangel, before being assigned as parish priest at Surviliškis in 1907. He was later assigned to Dawhinava in 1909, Kuźnica in 1914 (after the outbreak of World War I), and Pruzhany in 1919, where he would eventually become dean. In 1927, he was appointed honorary canon of the cathedral chapter of the Diocese of Pinsk; at the same time, he was also appointed parish priest and dean of Bielsk Podlaski. As dean, he supported local Catholic organizations as well as local chapters of the Polish Scouting and Guiding Association, while also renovating several churches in his deanery.

At the outbreak of World War 2, Beszta-Borowski was arrested by the Gestapo on 12 September 1939; however, he was released on 20 September 1939, as German forces evacuated in order to hand over control of Bielsk Podlaski to the Soviets. During these occupations, he was evicted from his rectory and harassed by NKVD agents, who sometimes interrogated him for days on end. Despite his hardships, he continued to conduct underground education, soon becoming a chaplain for the Home Army.

On 15 July 1943, Beszta-Borowski was arrested and taken to Pilicki Forest — 3 kilometres (1.9 mi) from the city center of Bielsk Podlaski — where he was summarily executed. He was declared venerable on March 23, 1999, and was beatified on June 13, 1999. His remains were exhumed in 2000 and buried at the Basilica of the Nativity of the Blessed Virgin Mary and St. Nicolas in Bielsk Podlaski.
