= Borowskie Skórki =

- Village
- Location within Poland
- Coordinates: 52°59′N 23°0′E
- Country: Poland
- Voivodeship: Podlaskie
- County: Białystok
- Gmina: Turośń Kościelna

Borowskie Skórki [bɔˈrɔfskʲɛ ˈskurki] is a village in the administrative district of Gmina Turośń Kościelna, within Białystok County, Podlaskie Voivodeship, in north-eastern Poland.
