= Turośń Dolna =

- Village
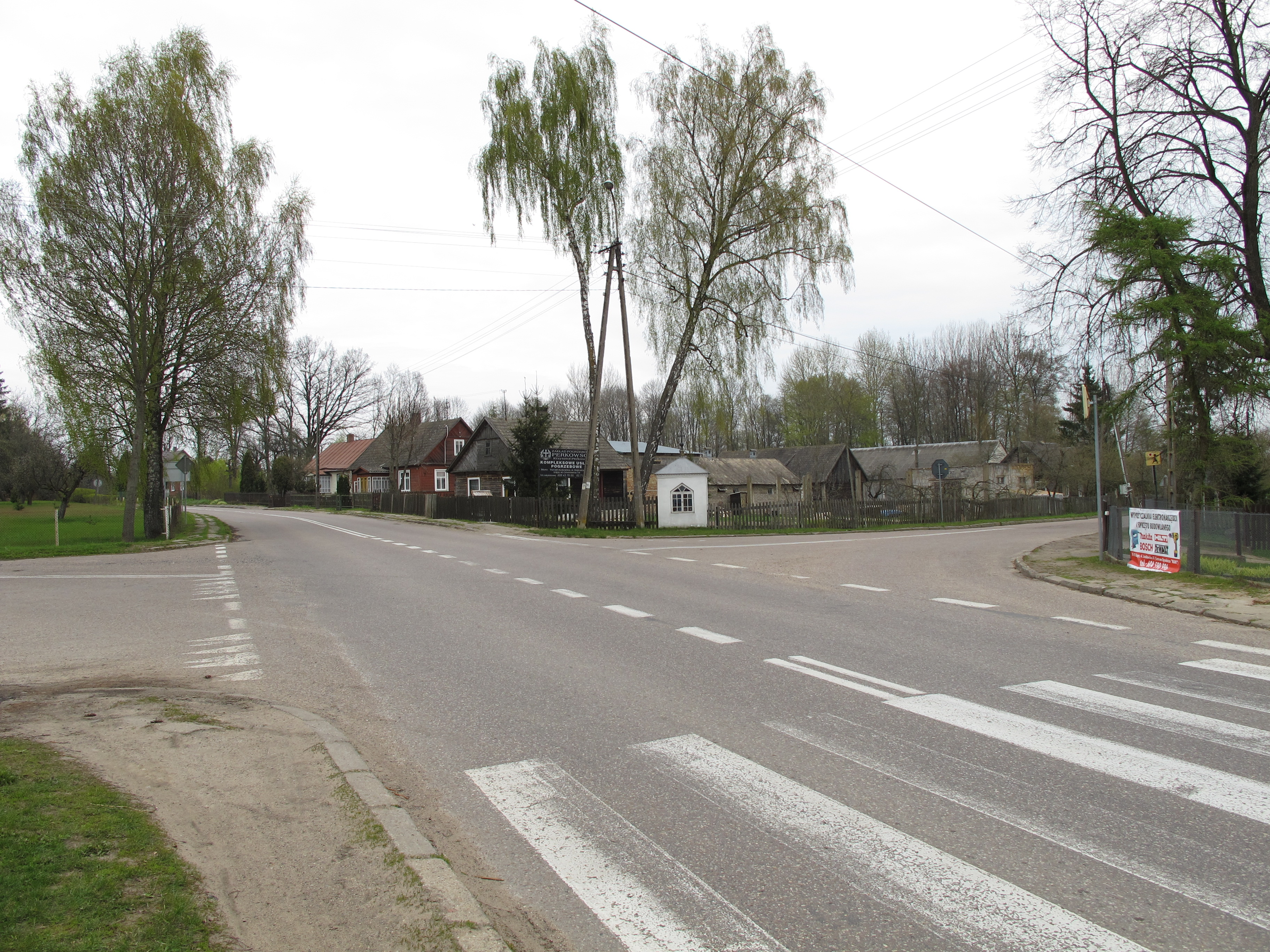

- Location within Poland
- Coordinates: 53°1′N 23°0′E
- Country: Poland
- Voivodeship: Podlaskie
- County: Białystok
- Gmina: Turośń Kościelna
- Population: 360

Turośń Dolna [ˈturɔɕɲ ˈdɔlna] is a village in the administrative district of Gmina Turośń Kościelna, within Białystok County, Podlaskie Voivodeship, in north-eastern Poland.
