= Baciuty-Kolonia =

- Village
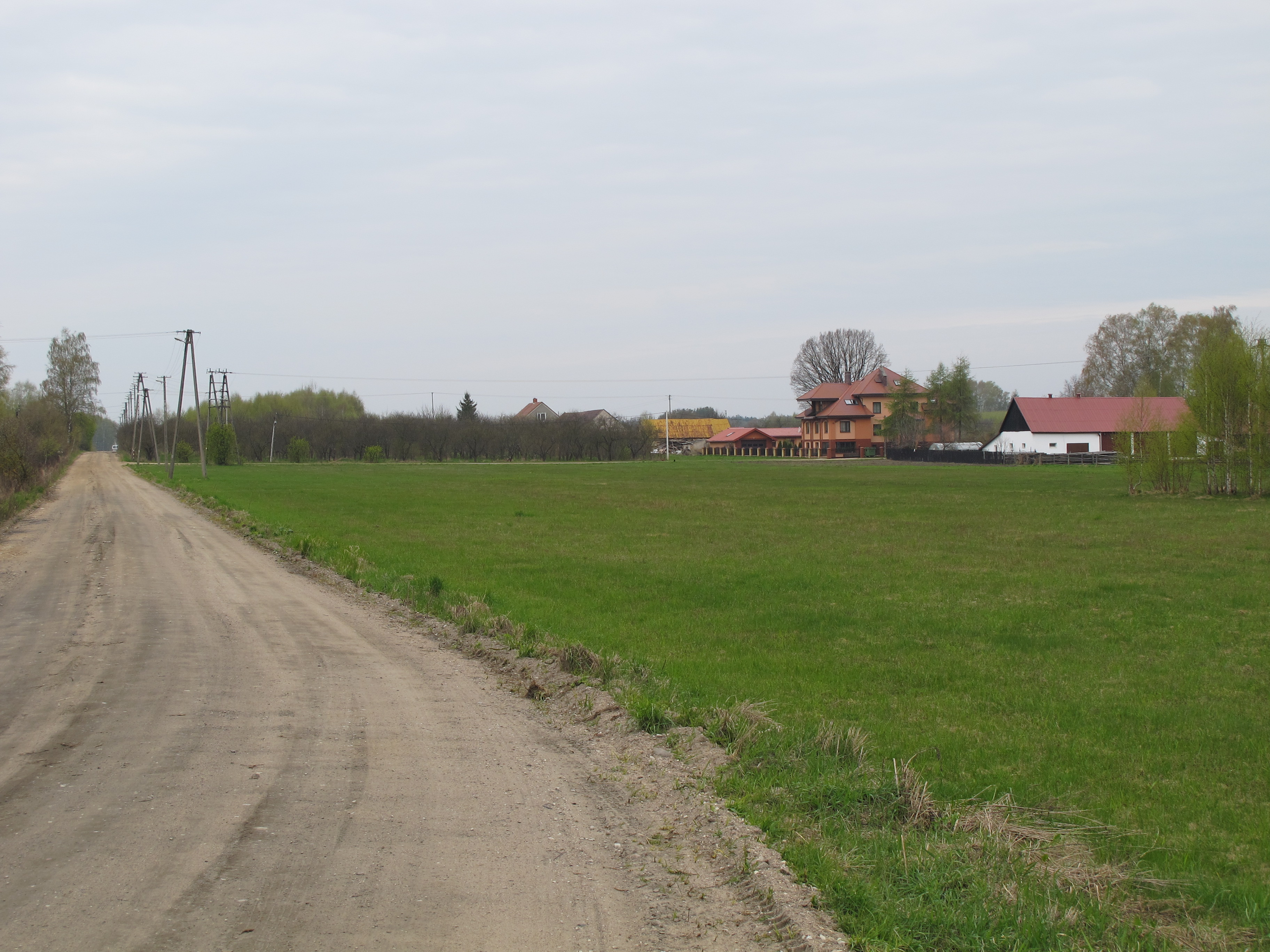

- Location within Poland
- Coordinates: 53°4′19.42″N 23°0′8.21″E
- Country: Poland
- Voivodeship: Podlaskie
- County: Białystok
- Gmina: Turośń Kościelna

Baciuty-Kolonia [baˈt͡ɕutɨ kɔˈlɔɲa] is a village in the administrative district of Gmina Turośń Kościelna, within Białystok County, Podlaskie Voivodeship, in north-eastern Poland.
