= Iwanówka, Białystok County =

Iwanówka
- Village
- Location within Poland
- Coordinates: 53°3′N 23°3′E
- Country: Poland
- Voivodeship: Podlaskie
- County: Białystok
- Gmina: Turośń Kościelna

Iwanówka [ivaˈnufka] is a village in the administrative district of Gmina Turośń Kościelna, within Białystok County, Podlaskie Voivodeship, in north-eastern Poland.
