= Lubejki =

- Village
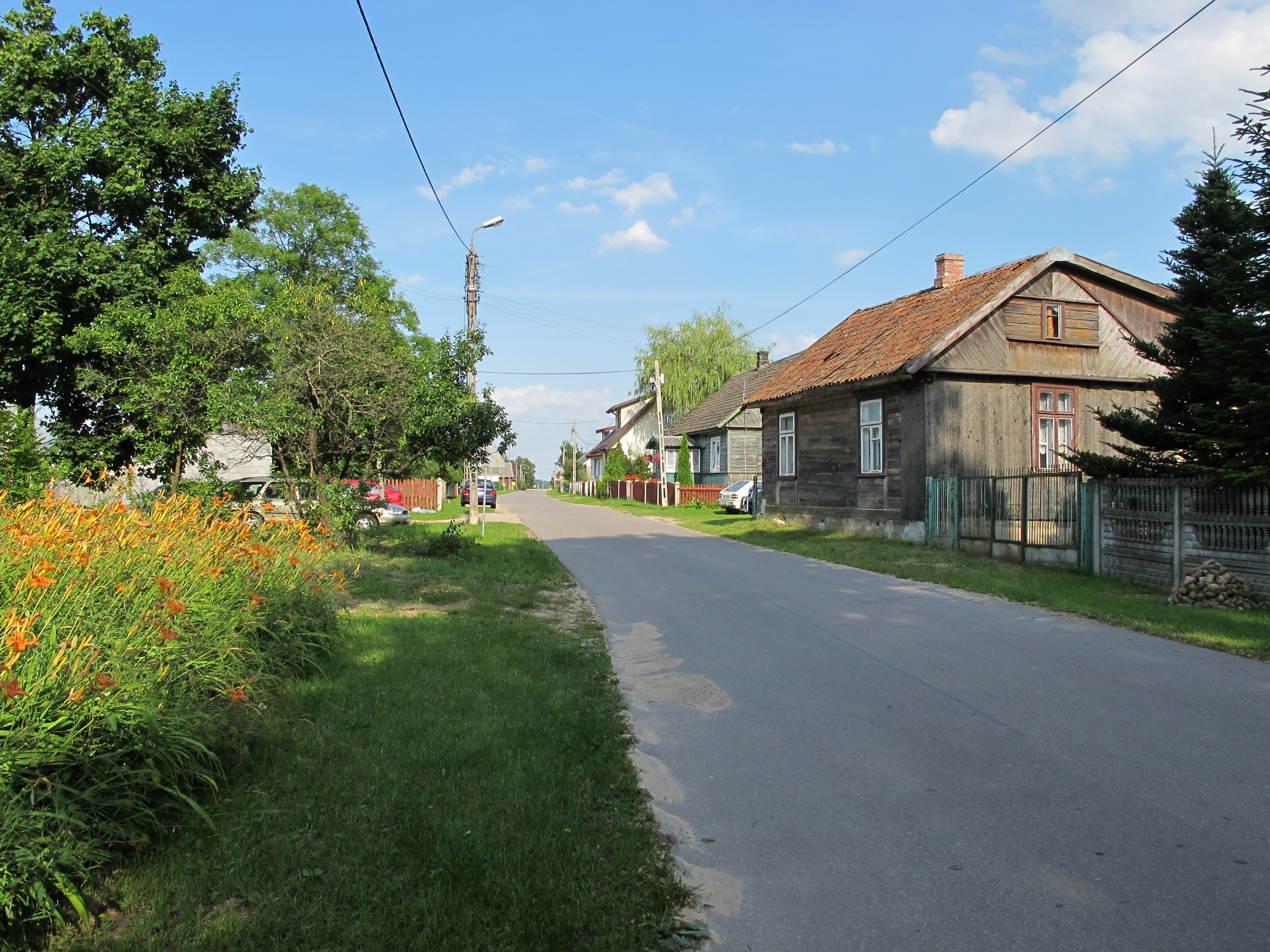

- Location within Poland
- Coordinates: 53°2′N 23°6′E
- Country: Poland
- Voivodeship: Podlaskie
- County: Białystok
- Gmina: Turośń Kościelna

Lubejki [luˈbɛi̯ki] is a village in the administrative district of Gmina Turośń Kościelna, within Białystok County, Podlaskie Voivodeship, in north-eastern Poland.
