= Czaczki Małe =

- Village
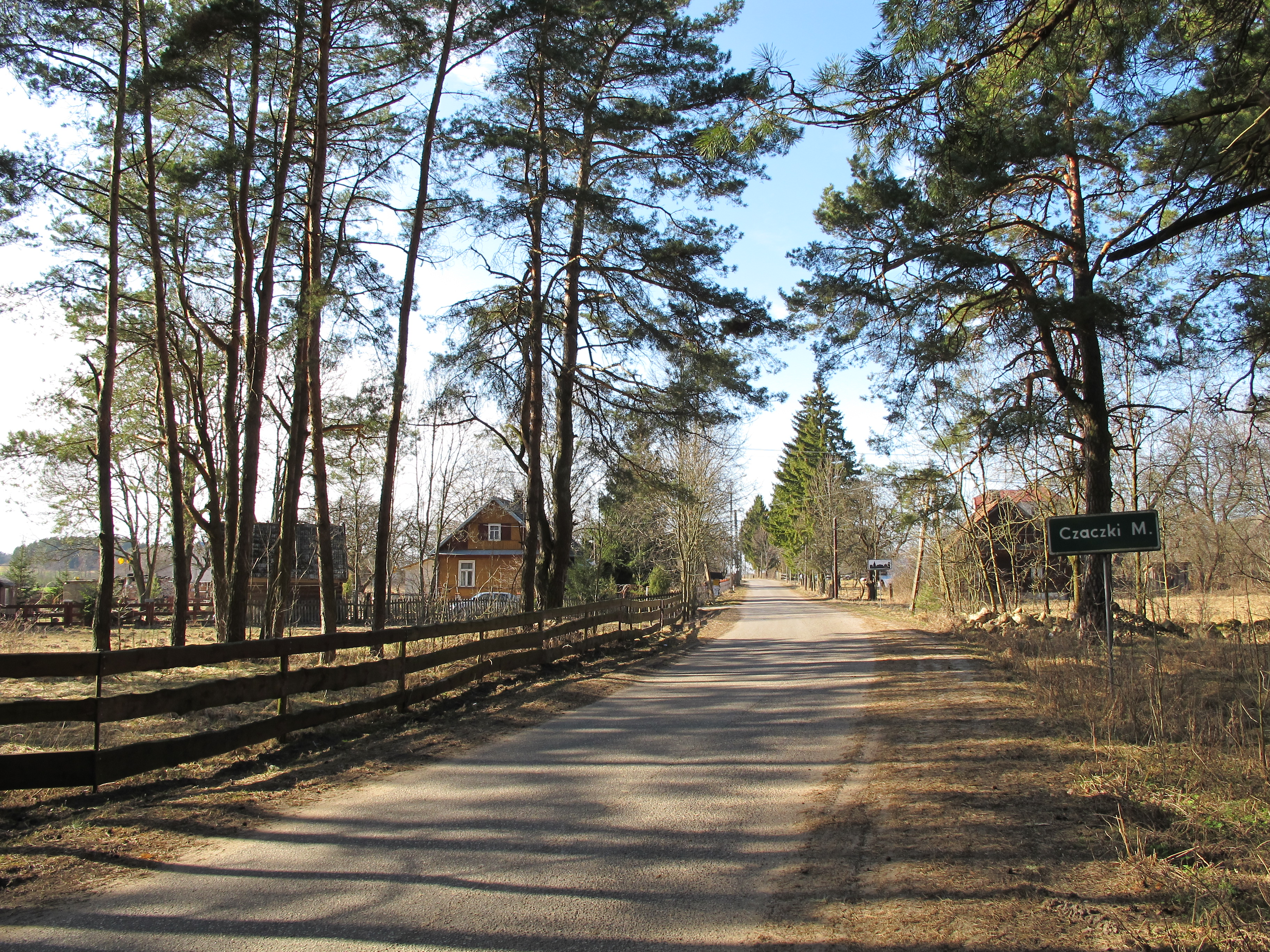
- City limit road sign in Czaczki Małe

- Location within Poland
- Coordinates: 52°57′40″N 23°03′40″E
- Country: Poland
- Voivodeship: Podlaskie
- County: Białystok
- Gmina: Turośń Kościelna

Czaczki Małe ([ˈt͡ʂat͡ʂki ˈmawɛ] tcha-TSCHI-maw-I) is a village in the administrative district of Gmina Turośń Kościelna, within Białystok County, Podlaskie Voivodeship, in north-eastern Poland.
