= Topilec-Kolonia =

- Village
- Location within Poland
- Coordinates: 53°04′40″N 22°54′26″E
- Country: Poland
- Voivodeship: Podlaskie
- County: Białystok
- Gmina: Turośń Kościelna

Topilec-Kolonia [tɔˈpilɛt͡s kɔˈlɔɲa] is a village in the administrative district of Gmina Turośń Kościelna, within Białystok County, Podlaskie Voivodeship, in north-eastern Poland.
