= Pomigacze =

- Village
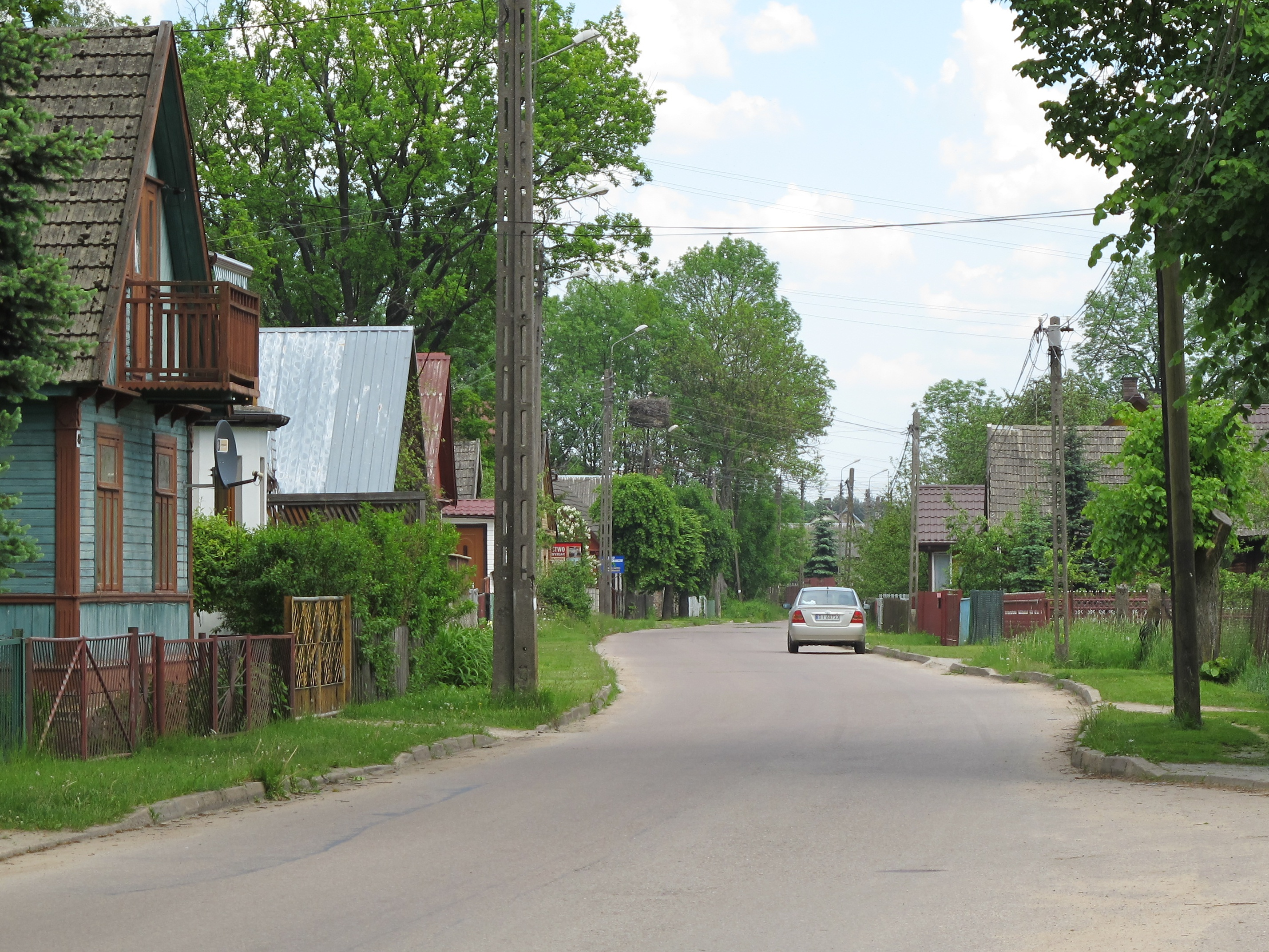
- Pomigacze

- Location within Poland
- Coordinates: 53°2′N 23°5′E
- Country: Poland
- Voivodeship: Podlaskie
- County: Białystok
- Gmina: Turośń Kościelna
- Population: 350

Pomigacze [pɔmiˈɡat͡ʂɛ] is a village in the administrative district of Gmina Turośń Kościelna, within Białystok County, Podlaskie Voivodeship, in north-eastern Poland.
