= Gmina Turośń Kościelna =

Gmina Turośń Kościelna Turośń Kościelna Commune
- Gmina
- Flag Coat of arms

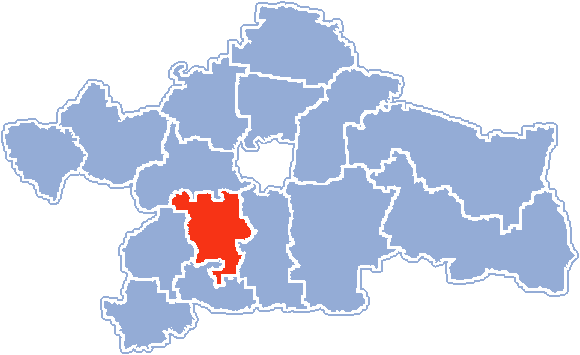
- Location within Białystok County
- Coordinates (Turośń Kościelna): 53°1′N 23°4′E
- Country: Poland
- Voivodeship: Podlaskie
- County: Białystok County
- Seat: Turośń Kościelna

Area
  - Total: 140.3 km^{2} (54.2 sq mi)

Population (2006)
  - Total: 5,348
  - Density: 38.12/km^{2} (98.73/sq mi)
- Website: http://www.umwp-podlasie.pl/bip/gmina/turosn_kosc

Gmina Turośń Kościelna is a rural gmina (administrative district) in Białystok County, Podlaskie Voivodeship, in north-eastern Poland. Its seat is the village of Turośń Kościelna, which lies approximately 13 kilometres (8 mi) south-west of the regional capital Białystok.

The gmina covers an area of 140.3 square kilometres (54.2 sq mi), and as of 2006 its total population is 5,348.

== Villages ==
Gmina Turośń Kościelna contains the villages and settlements of Baciuty, Baciuty-Kolonia, Barszczówka, Bojary, Borowskie Cibory, Borowskie Gziki, Borowskie Michały, Borowskie Olki, Borowskie Skórki, Borowskie Wypychy, Borowskie Żaki, Chodory, Czaczki Małe, Czaczki Wielkie, Dobrowoda, Dołki, Iwanówka, Juraszki, Lubejki, Markowszczyzna, Niecki, Niewodnica Korycka, Niewodnica Kościelna, Pomigacze, Stoczki, Tołcze, Topilec, Topilec-Kolonia, Trypucie, Turośń Dolna, Turośń Kościelna, Zalesiany and Zawady.

== Neighbouring gminas ==
Gmina Turośń Kościelna is bordered by the gminas of Choroszcz, Juchnowiec Kościelny, Łapy and Suraż.
