= Dołki, Podlaskie Voivodeship =

Dołki
- Village
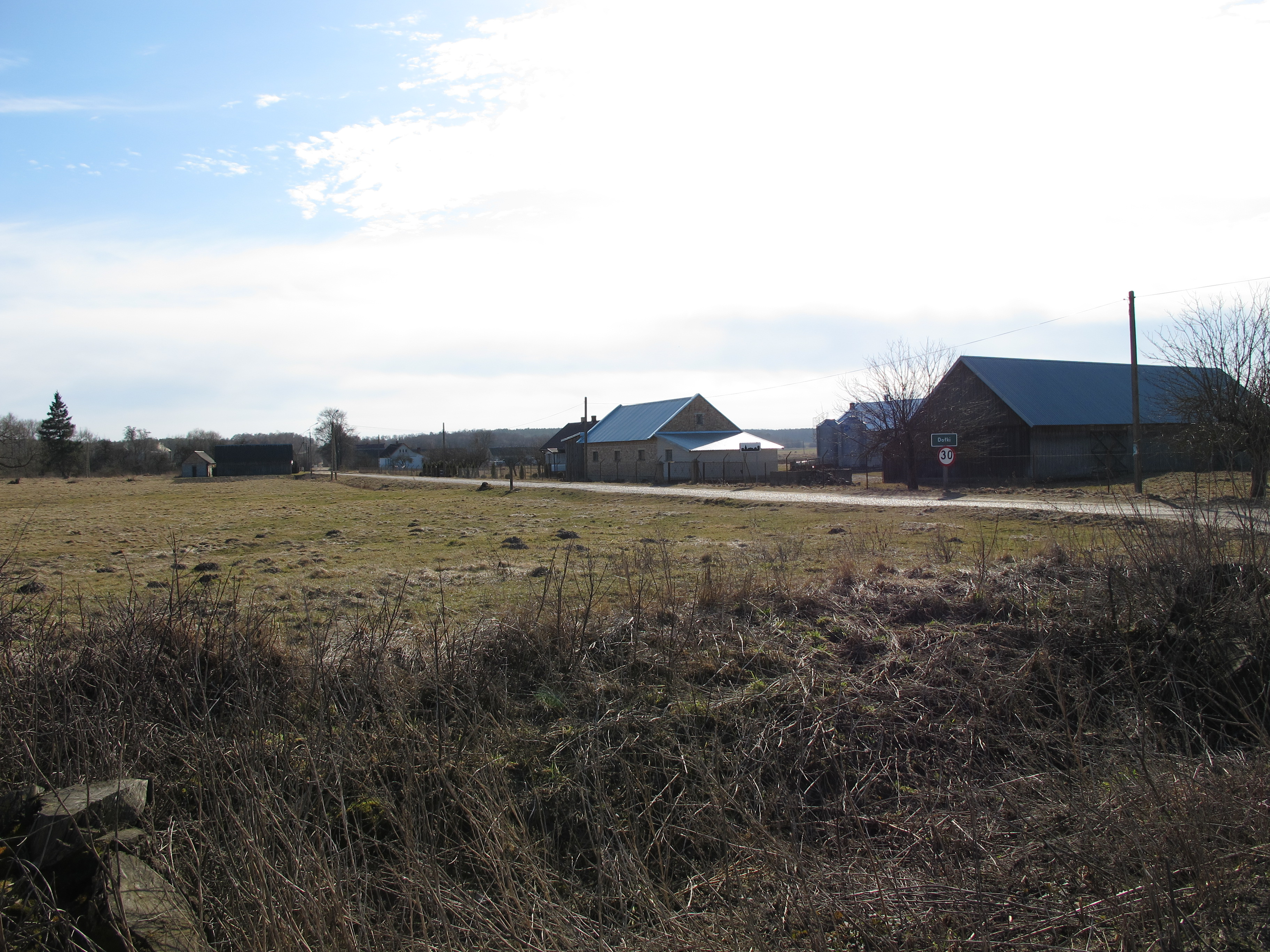

- Location within Poland
- Coordinates: 52°58′N 23°2′E
- Country: Poland
- Voivodeship: Podlaskie
- County: Białystok
- Gmina: Turośń Kościelna

Dołki [ˈdɔu̯ki] is a village in the administrative district of Gmina Turośń Kościelna, within Białystok County, Podlaskie Voivodeship, in north-eastern Poland.
