= Dobrowoda, Białystok County =

Dobrowoda
- Village
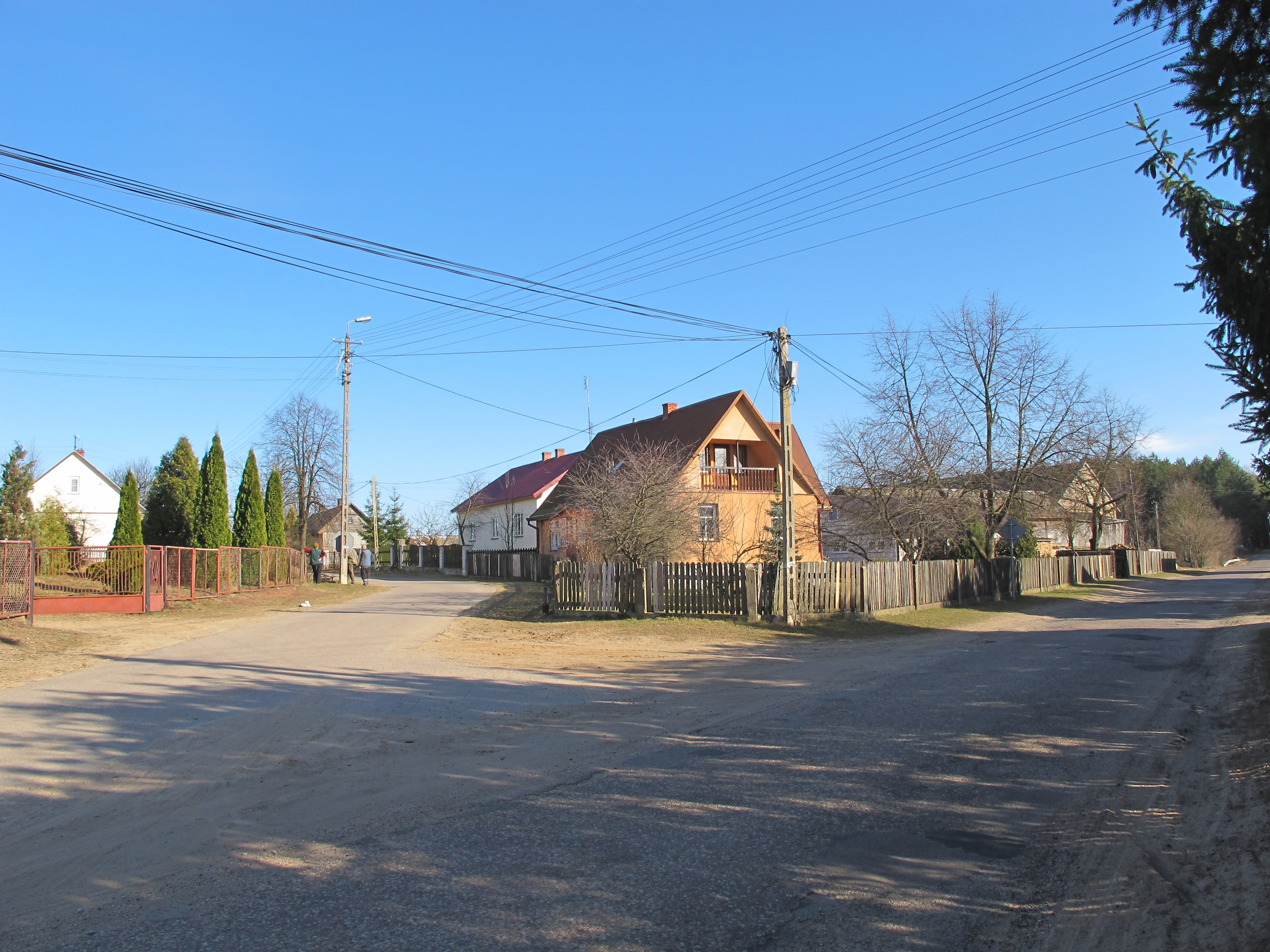

- Location within Poland
- Coordinates: 53°2′20″N 22°59′38″E
- Country: Poland
- Voivodeship: Podlaskie
- County: Białystok
- Gmina: Turośń Kościelna

Dobrowoda [dɔbrɔˈvɔda] is a village in the administrative district of Gmina Turośń Kościelna, within Białystok County, Podlaskie Voivodeship, in north-eastern Poland.
