= Borowskie Olki =

- Village
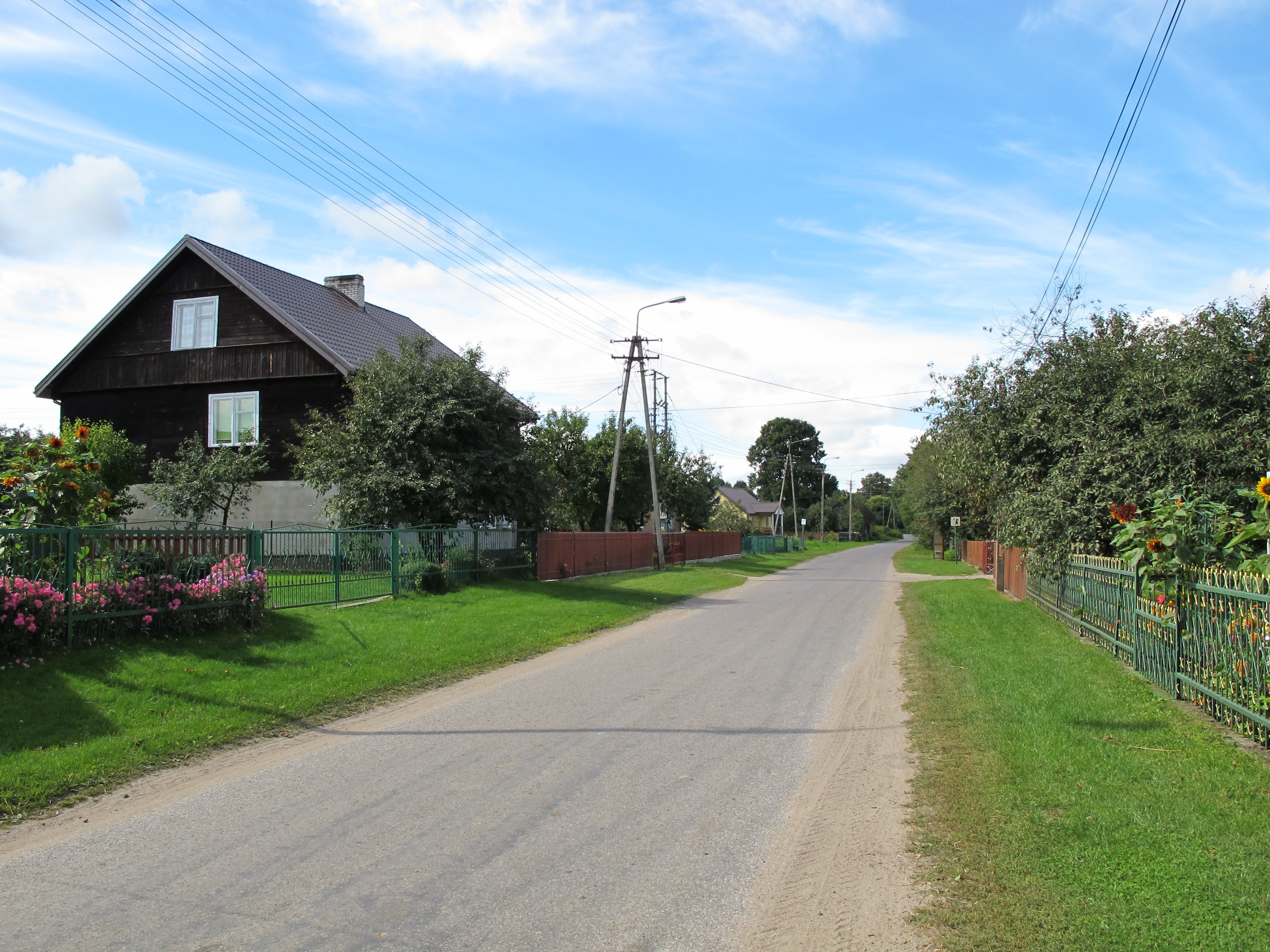

- Location within Poland
- Coordinates: 52°59′59.12″N 22°58′41.23″E
- Country: Poland
- Voivodeship: Podlaskie
- County: Białystok
- Gmina: Turośń Kościelna

Borowskie Olki [bɔˈrɔfskʲɛ ˈɔlki] is a village in the administrative district of Gmina Turośń Kościelna, within Białystok County, Podlaskie Voivodeship, in north-eastern Poland.
