= Turośń Kościelna =

- Village
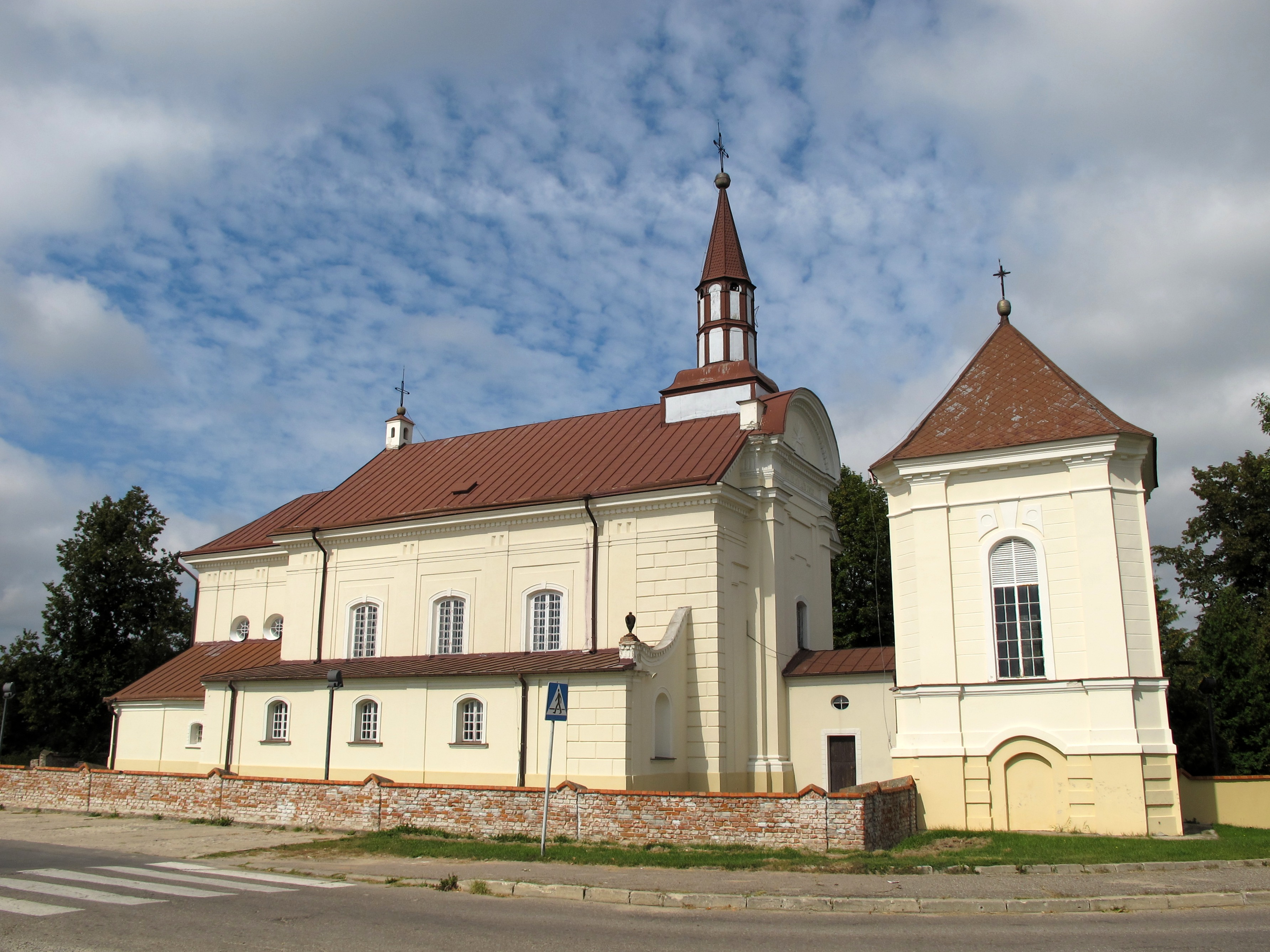
- Holy Trinity church in Turośń Kościelna

- Location within Poland
- Coordinates: 53°1′N 23°4′E
- Country: Poland
- Voivodeship: Podlaskie
- County: Białystok
- Gmina: Turośń Kościelna

Population
  - Total: 700
- Time zone: UTC+1 (CET)
  - Summer (DST): UTC+2 (CEST)
- Vehicle registration: BIA

Turośń Kościelna [ˈturɔɕɲ kɔɕˈt͡ɕɛlna] is a village in Białystok County, Podlaskie Voivodeship, in north-eastern Poland. It is the seat of the gmina (administrative district) called Gmina Turośń Kościelna.

== History ==
Following the German-Soviet invasion of Poland, which started World War II in September 1939, the village was first occupied by the Soviet Union until 1941, and then by Germany until 1944. A local Polish policeman was murdered by the Russians in the Katyn massacre in 1940.
