= List of minor planets: 549001–550000 =

The following is a partial list of minor planets, running from minor-planet number 549001 through 550000, inclusive. The primary data for this and other partial lists is based on JPL's "Small-Body Orbital Elements" and data available from the Minor Planet Center. Critical list information is also provided by the MPC, unless otherwise specified from Lowell Observatory. A detailed description of the table's columns and additional sources are given on the main page including a complete list of every page in this series, and a statistical break-up on the dynamical classification of minor planets.

Also see the summary list of all named bodies in numerical and alphabetical order, and the corresponding naming citations for the number range of this particular list. New namings may only be added to this list after official publication, as the preannouncement of names is condemned by the Working Group for Small Bodies Nomenclature of the International Astronomical Union.

Near-Earth obj.	MBA (inner)	MBA (outer)	Centaur
Mars-crosser	MBA (middle)	Jupiter trojan	Trans-Neptunian obj.
Unclassified

== 549001–549100 ==
Designation			Discovery			Properties		Ref
Permanent	Provisional	Named after	Date	Site	Discoverer(s)	Category	Diam.	Ref
549001	2011 BE_{28}	—	September 24, 2008	Mount Lemmon	Mount Lemmon Survey	·	2.4 km	MPC · JPL
549002	2011 BM_{30}	—	January 26, 2011	Mount Lemmon	Mount Lemmon Survey	PAD	1.5 km	MPC · JPL
549003	2011 BU_{32}	—	February 4, 2006	Kitt Peak	Spacewatch	·	1.5 km	MPC · JPL
549004	2011 BZ_{37}	—	January 28, 2011	Mount Lemmon	Mount Lemmon Survey	H	380 m	MPC · JPL
549005	2011 BF_{38}	—	January 16, 2004	Palomar	NEAT	·	700 m	MPC · JPL
549006	2011 BK_{41}	—	January 30, 2011	Piszkés-tető	K. Sárneczky, Z. Kuli	·	1.7 km	MPC · JPL
549007	2011 BJ_{43}	—	January 30, 2011	Piszkés-tető	K. Sárneczky, Z. Kuli	·	680 m	MPC · JPL
549008	2011 BN_{48}	—	January 31, 2011	Piszkés-tető	K. Sárneczky, Z. Kuli	·	570 m	MPC · JPL
549009	2011 BP_{49}	—	January 31, 2011	Piszkés-tető	K. Sárneczky, Z. Kuli	·	2.3 km	MPC · JPL
549010	2011 BV_{49}	—	January 31, 2011	Piszkés-tető	K. Sárneczky, Z. Kuli	·	1.6 km	MPC · JPL
549011	2011 BN_{54}	—	January 30, 2011	Mount Lemmon	Mount Lemmon Survey	·	2.3 km	MPC · JPL
549012	2011 BO_{54}	—	December 31, 2000	Kitt Peak	Spacewatch	·	800 m	MPC · JPL
549013	2011 BW_{54}	—	August 31, 2005	Palomar	NEAT	HNS	1.2 km	MPC · JPL
549014	2011 BJ_{55}	—	January 30, 2011	Mayhill-ISON	L. Elenin	·	1.8 km	MPC · JPL
549015	2011 BL_{56}	—	September 28, 2006	Kitt Peak	Spacewatch	·	580 m	MPC · JPL
549016	2011 BM_{56}	—	September 28, 2006	Catalina	CSS	·	800 m	MPC · JPL
549017	2011 BE_{63}	—	January 27, 2011	Kitt Peak	Spacewatch	BRA	970 m	MPC · JPL
549018	2011 BM_{63}	—	January 27, 2011	Kitt Peak	Spacewatch	TIN	1.0 km	MPC · JPL
549019	2011 BO_{63}	—	November 26, 2003	Kitt Peak	Spacewatch	·	570 m	MPC · JPL
549020	2011 BU_{67}	—	September 28, 2009	Kitt Peak	Spacewatch	·	1.7 km	MPC · JPL
549021	2011 BN_{69}	—	July 5, 2008	Siding Spring	SSS	·	2.5 km	MPC · JPL
549022	2011 BD_{70}	—	August 15, 2004	Cerro Tololo	Deep Ecliptic Survey	(12739)	1.5 km	MPC · JPL
549023	2011 BR_{71}	—	September 26, 2002	Palomar	NEAT	·	860 m	MPC · JPL
549024	2011 BJ_{72}	—	November 19, 2006	Kitt Peak	Spacewatch	·	800 m	MPC · JPL
549025	2011 BZ_{72}	—	November 14, 2006	Catalina	CSS	·	820 m	MPC · JPL
549026	2011 BL_{73}	—	September 25, 2006	Kitt Peak	Spacewatch	·	550 m	MPC · JPL
549027	2011 BA_{75}	—	February 25, 2011	Mount Lemmon	Mount Lemmon Survey	·	500 m	MPC · JPL
549028	2011 BW_{75}	—	February 10, 2011	Mount Lemmon	Mount Lemmon Survey	·	730 m	MPC · JPL
549029	2011 BS_{76}	—	July 18, 2001	Kitt Peak	Spacewatch	PHO	780 m	MPC · JPL
549030	2011 BG_{79}	—	August 22, 2004	Kitt Peak	Spacewatch	·	2.9 km	MPC · JPL
549031	2011 BZ_{79}	—	January 27, 2011	Mount Lemmon	Mount Lemmon Survey	(18466)	1.8 km	MPC · JPL
549032	2011 BS_{80}	—	March 12, 2007	Catalina	CSS	GEF	1.2 km	MPC · JPL
549033	2011 BG_{86}	—	March 5, 2008	Kitt Peak	Spacewatch	·	460 m	MPC · JPL
549034	2011 BZ_{87}	—	March 10, 2007	Mount Lemmon	Mount Lemmon Survey	·	1.7 km	MPC · JPL
549035	2011 BA_{88}	—	December 8, 2010	Mount Lemmon	Mount Lemmon Survey	·	570 m	MPC · JPL
549036	2011 BC_{89}	—	January 30, 2004	Kitt Peak	Spacewatch	PHO	500 m	MPC · JPL
549037	2011 BO_{91}	—	August 26, 2006	Lulin	LUSS	·	740 m	MPC · JPL
549038	2011 BP_{95}	—	January 29, 2011	Mount Lemmon	Mount Lemmon Survey	·	1.5 km	MPC · JPL
549039	2011 BX_{95}	—	November 23, 2006	Mount Lemmon	Mount Lemmon Survey	·	630 m	MPC · JPL
549040	2011 BG_{97}	—	January 29, 2011	Mount Lemmon	Mount Lemmon Survey	AGN	1.0 km	MPC · JPL
549041	2011 BB_{99}	—	August 28, 2006	Kitt Peak	Spacewatch	·	640 m	MPC · JPL
549042	2011 BR_{106}	—	January 29, 2011	Kitt Peak	Spacewatch	·	1.8 km	MPC · JPL
549043	2011 BM_{110}	—	September 12, 2009	Kitt Peak	Spacewatch	·	470 m	MPC · JPL
549044	2011 BR_{115}	—	January 23, 2011	Mount Lemmon	Mount Lemmon Survey	·	470 m	MPC · JPL
549045	2011 BF_{117}	—	November 22, 2005	Catalina	CSS	·	1.8 km	MPC · JPL
549046	2011 BO_{117}	—	January 3, 2011	Piszkés-tető	K. Sárneczky, Z. Kuli	·	3.8 km	MPC · JPL
549047	2011 BH_{120}	—	February 2, 2006	Kitt Peak	Spacewatch	EOS	1.7 km	MPC · JPL
549048	2011 BO_{120}	—	January 11, 2011	Kitt Peak	Spacewatch	·	1.7 km	MPC · JPL
549049	2011 BE_{123}	—	February 7, 2011	Mount Lemmon	Mount Lemmon Survey	·	950 m	MPC · JPL
549050	2011 BQ_{124}	—	January 13, 2011	Kitt Peak	Spacewatch	·	2.1 km	MPC · JPL
549051	2011 BJ_{125}	—	January 27, 2011	Mount Lemmon	Mount Lemmon Survey	KOR	1.0 km	MPC · JPL
549052	2011 BQ_{125}	—	January 27, 2011	Mount Lemmon	Mount Lemmon Survey	·	1.6 km	MPC · JPL
549053	2011 BC_{126}	—	November 17, 2009	Mount Lemmon	Mount Lemmon Survey	·	1.9 km	MPC · JPL
549054	2011 BE_{126}	—	January 27, 2011	Mount Lemmon	Mount Lemmon Survey	·	1.9 km	MPC · JPL
549055	2011 BO_{127}	—	January 28, 2011	Kitt Peak	Spacewatch	·	1.4 km	MPC · JPL
549056	2011 BS_{128}	—	January 28, 2011	Mount Lemmon	Mount Lemmon Survey	HOF	2.8 km	MPC · JPL
549057	2011 BA_{132}	—	January 28, 2011	Mount Lemmon	Mount Lemmon Survey	·	2.0 km	MPC · JPL
549058	2011 BV_{134}	—	January 29, 2011	Mount Lemmon	Mount Lemmon Survey	·	1.7 km	MPC · JPL
549059	2011 BG_{138}	—	January 29, 2011	Mount Lemmon	Mount Lemmon Survey	·	1.9 km	MPC · JPL
549060	2011 BS_{138}	—	September 22, 2009	Kitt Peak	Spacewatch	·	1.7 km	MPC · JPL
549061	2011 BP_{139}	—	January 29, 2011	Mount Lemmon	Mount Lemmon Survey	615	1.3 km	MPC · JPL
549062	2011 BK_{142}	—	April 16, 2008	Mount Lemmon	Mount Lemmon Survey	·	3.3 km	MPC · JPL
549063	2011 BP_{143}	—	January 29, 2011	Mount Lemmon	Mount Lemmon Survey	·	2.4 km	MPC · JPL
549064	2011 BW_{144}	—	January 29, 2011	Mount Lemmon	Mount Lemmon Survey	·	1.7 km	MPC · JPL
549065	2011 BA_{147}	—	January 29, 2011	Mount Lemmon	Mount Lemmon Survey	KOR	1.3 km	MPC · JPL
549066	2011 BY_{147}	—	January 29, 2011	Mount Lemmon	Mount Lemmon Survey	KOR	1.2 km	MPC · JPL
549067	2011 BB_{150}	—	April 30, 2005	Kitt Peak	Spacewatch	·	490 m	MPC · JPL
549068	2011 BV_{152}	—	October 29, 2010	Mount Lemmon	Mount Lemmon Survey	HNS	1.1 km	MPC · JPL
549069	2011 BV_{154}	—	January 27, 2011	Mount Lemmon	Mount Lemmon Survey	·	480 m	MPC · JPL
549070	2011 BB_{155}	—	January 27, 2011	Mount Lemmon	Mount Lemmon Survey	·	2.1 km	MPC · JPL
549071	2011 BX_{157}	—	January 17, 2011	Mount Lemmon	Mount Lemmon Survey	·	590 m	MPC · JPL
549072	2011 BT_{158}	—	January 29, 2011	Mount Lemmon	Mount Lemmon Survey	·	1 km	MPC · JPL
549073	2011 BK_{162}	—	February 7, 2002	Palomar	NEAT	AGN	1.4 km	MPC · JPL
549074	2011 BE_{165}	—	January 13, 2011	Kitt Peak	Spacewatch	·	700 m	MPC · JPL
549075	2011 BY_{167}	—	February 25, 2011	Mount Lemmon	Mount Lemmon Survey	·	1.4 km	MPC · JPL
549076	2011 BN_{171}	—	August 8, 2013	Haleakala	Pan-STARRS 1	·	1.5 km	MPC · JPL
549077	2011 BS_{171}	—	February 13, 2011	Mount Lemmon	Mount Lemmon Survey	·	990 m	MPC · JPL
549078	2011 BY_{171}	—	January 29, 2011	Mount Lemmon	Mount Lemmon Survey	GEF	970 m	MPC · JPL
549079	2011 BF_{172}	—	August 8, 2013	Kitt Peak	Spacewatch	·	1.9 km	MPC · JPL
549080	2011 BJ_{172}	—	January 28, 2011	Mount Lemmon	Mount Lemmon Survey	V	580 m	MPC · JPL
549081	2011 BQ_{173}	—	February 11, 2011	Mount Lemmon	Mount Lemmon Survey	·	1.7 km	MPC · JPL
549082	2011 BC_{174}	—	July 14, 2013	Haleakala	Pan-STARRS 1	KOR	1.1 km	MPC · JPL
549083	2011 BQ_{175}	—	February 13, 2011	Mount Lemmon	Mount Lemmon Survey	·	930 m	MPC · JPL
549084	2011 BA_{182}	—	January 9, 2015	Haleakala	Pan-STARRS 1	·	1.5 km	MPC · JPL
549085	2011 BH_{183}	—	October 26, 2009	Mount Lemmon	Mount Lemmon Survey	·	1.5 km	MPC · JPL
549086	2011 BV_{185}	—	February 6, 2016	Haleakala	Pan-STARRS 1	·	1.6 km	MPC · JPL
549087	2011 BF_{196}	—	January 28, 2011	Mount Lemmon	Mount Lemmon Survey	H	300 m	MPC · JPL
549088	2011 CS_{2}	—	February 14, 2004	Palomar	NEAT	PHO	890 m	MPC · JPL
549089	2011 CC_{5}	—	February 5, 2011	Kitt Peak	Spacewatch	·	680 m	MPC · JPL
549090	2011 CD_{6}	—	February 5, 2011	Mount Lemmon	Mount Lemmon Survey	·	890 m	MPC · JPL
549091	2011 CA_{13}	—	February 7, 2006	Mount Lemmon	Mount Lemmon Survey	·	3.1 km	MPC · JPL
549092	2011 CQ_{13}	—	February 5, 2011	Mount Lemmon	Mount Lemmon Survey	·	1.6 km	MPC · JPL
549093	2011 CQ_{22}	—	January 30, 2011	Kitt Peak	Spacewatch	·	2.1 km	MPC · JPL
549094	2011 CD_{29}	—	January 17, 2011	Mount Lemmon	Mount Lemmon Survey	·	2.6 km	MPC · JPL
549095	2011 CQ_{29}	—	February 4, 2011	Mayhill-ISON	L. Elenin	·	1.8 km	MPC · JPL
549096	2011 CF_{30}	—	January 11, 2011	Mount Lemmon	Mount Lemmon Survey	·	1.6 km	MPC · JPL
549097	2011 CJ_{30}	—	January 27, 2011	Mount Lemmon	Mount Lemmon Survey	·	1.5 km	MPC · JPL
549098	2011 CO_{31}	—	May 13, 2004	Palomar	NEAT	·	1.4 km	MPC · JPL
549099	2011 CC_{33}	—	February 13, 2002	Kitt Peak	Spacewatch	·	2.9 km	MPC · JPL
549100	2011 CG_{35}	—	July 13, 2001	Palomar	NEAT	H	480 m	MPC · JPL

== 549101–549200 ==
back to top

Designation			Discovery			Properties		Ref
Permanent	Provisional	Named after	Date	Site	Discoverer(s)	Category	Diam.	Ref
549101	2011 CE_{36}	—	February 5, 2011	Catalina	CSS	·	660 m	MPC · JPL
549102	2011 CD_{38}	—	February 5, 2011	Mount Lemmon	Mount Lemmon Survey	·	1.5 km	MPC · JPL
549103	2011 CS_{38}	—	March 26, 2007	Mount Lemmon	Mount Lemmon Survey	KOR	1.1 km	MPC · JPL
549104	2011 CQ_{39}	—	December 7, 2005	Kitt Peak	Spacewatch	·	1.6 km	MPC · JPL
549105	2011 CR_{40}	—	December 21, 2000	Kitt Peak	Spacewatch	·	640 m	MPC · JPL
549106	2011 CN_{41}	—	February 8, 2011	Mount Lemmon	Mount Lemmon Survey	·	500 m	MPC · JPL
549107 Hackitamás	2011 CG_{45}	Hackitamás	January 31, 2011	Piszkéstető	S. Kürti, K. Sárneczky	TIR	1.7 km	MPC · JPL
549108	2011 CS_{45}	—	February 8, 2011	Mount Lemmon	Mount Lemmon Survey	PAD	1.2 km	MPC · JPL
549109	2011 CL_{46}	—	March 31, 2008	Vail-Jarnac	Jarnac	·	560 m	MPC · JPL
549110	2011 CB_{47}	—	February 24, 2006	Palomar	NEAT	H	690 m	MPC · JPL
549111	2011 CL_{49}	—	April 6, 2005	Mount Lemmon	Mount Lemmon Survey	·	560 m	MPC · JPL
549112	2011 CU_{52}	—	February 7, 2011	Mount Lemmon	Mount Lemmon Survey	·	1.5 km	MPC · JPL
549113	2011 CD_{54}	—	February 8, 2011	Mount Lemmon	Mount Lemmon Survey	·	1.7 km	MPC · JPL
549114	2011 CQ_{55}	—	July 3, 2005	Siding Spring	SSS	PHO	830 m	MPC · JPL
549115	2011 CR_{61}	—	March 12, 2008	Kitt Peak	Spacewatch	·	580 m	MPC · JPL
549116	2011 CM_{65}	—	February 12, 2011	Sandlot	G. Hug	·	2.6 km	MPC · JPL
549117	2011 CQ_{67}	—	August 21, 2008	Kitt Peak	Spacewatch	·	2.4 km	MPC · JPL
549118	2011 CR_{77}	—	April 9, 2003	Kitt Peak	Spacewatch	·	2.5 km	MPC · JPL
549119	2011 CS_{80}	—	October 22, 2009	Mount Lemmon	Mount Lemmon Survey	KOR	1.2 km	MPC · JPL
549120	2011 CD_{81}	—	April 16, 2007	Mount Lemmon	Mount Lemmon Survey	KOR	1.4 km	MPC · JPL
549121	2011 CK_{87}	—	October 18, 2006	Piszkéstető	K. Sárneczky	·	640 m	MPC · JPL
549122	2011 CH_{90}	—	February 10, 2011	Mount Lemmon	Mount Lemmon Survey	·	1.8 km	MPC · JPL
549123	2011 CP_{92}	—	February 5, 2011	Haleakala	Pan-STARRS 1	·	1.5 km	MPC · JPL
549124	2011 CF_{94}	—	February 10, 2011	Mount Lemmon	Mount Lemmon Survey	·	2.2 km	MPC · JPL
549125	2011 CA_{103}	—	December 13, 2006	Kitt Peak	Spacewatch	NYS	760 m	MPC · JPL
549126	2011 CB_{105}	—	October 24, 2009	Kitt Peak	Spacewatch	·	560 m	MPC · JPL
549127	2011 CP_{105}	—	September 20, 2003	Kitt Peak	Spacewatch	·	2.0 km	MPC · JPL
549128	2011 CL_{106}	—	March 5, 2011	Mount Lemmon	Mount Lemmon Survey	·	2.1 km	MPC · JPL
549129	2011 CE_{107}	—	September 6, 2008	Mount Lemmon	Mount Lemmon Survey	KOR	1.2 km	MPC · JPL
549130	2011 CK_{107}	—	September 2, 2008	Kitt Peak	Spacewatch	·	2.3 km	MPC · JPL
549131	2011 CE_{108}	—	February 25, 2011	Mount Lemmon	Mount Lemmon Survey	·	1.3 km	MPC · JPL
549132	2011 CO_{108}	—	November 10, 2009	Mount Lemmon	Mount Lemmon Survey	·	1.6 km	MPC · JPL
549133	2011 CL_{113}	—	December 24, 2005	Kitt Peak	Spacewatch	·	2.1 km	MPC · JPL
549134	2011 CO_{114}	—	January 5, 2006	Kitt Peak	Spacewatch	AGN	970 m	MPC · JPL
549135	2011 CS_{116}	—	November 7, 2005	Mauna Kea	A. Boattini	·	1.8 km	MPC · JPL
549136	2011 CJ_{122}	—	January 4, 2011	Mount Lemmon	Mount Lemmon Survey	·	980 m	MPC · JPL
549137	2011 CH_{125}	—	February 8, 2011	Catalina	CSS	H	410 m	MPC · JPL
549138	2011 CC_{127}	—	February 11, 2011	Mount Lemmon	Mount Lemmon Survey	·	1.7 km	MPC · JPL
549139	2011 CN_{127}	—	February 26, 2011	Mount Lemmon	Mount Lemmon Survey	·	1.6 km	MPC · JPL
549140	2011 CV_{128}	—	February 6, 2011	Catalina	CSS	·	1.6 km	MPC · JPL
549141	2011 CW_{132}	—	April 6, 2008	Mount Lemmon	Mount Lemmon Survey	·	510 m	MPC · JPL
549142	2011 CC_{136}	—	February 12, 2011	Mount Lemmon	Mount Lemmon Survey	·	710 m	MPC · JPL
549143	2011 DZ_{2}	—	March 3, 2000	Apache Point	SDSS Collaboration	·	1.3 km	MPC · JPL
549144	2011 DT_{4}	—	October 9, 1999	Kitt Peak	Spacewatch	KOR	1.1 km	MPC · JPL
549145	2011 DW_{5}	—	September 18, 2009	Kitt Peak	Spacewatch	·	860 m	MPC · JPL
549146	2011 DM_{7}	—	January 17, 2007	Palomar	NEAT	·	890 m	MPC · JPL
549147	2011 DH_{19}	—	March 12, 2007	Altschwendt	W. Ries	·	1.7 km	MPC · JPL
549148	2011 DG_{21}	—	February 25, 2011	Mount Lemmon	Mount Lemmon Survey	·	1.9 km	MPC · JPL
549149	2011 DV_{21}	—	February 21, 2001	Kitt Peak	Spacewatch	KOR	1.4 km	MPC · JPL
549150	2011 DE_{23}	—	April 29, 2008	Mount Lemmon	Mount Lemmon Survey	·	610 m	MPC · JPL
549151 Serra-Ricart	2011 DG_{24}	Serra-Ricart	February 24, 2011	SM Montmagastrell	Bosch, J. M.	·	710 m	MPC · JPL
549152	2011 DD_{28}	—	April 10, 2005	Kitt Peak	Deep Ecliptic Survey	·	550 m	MPC · JPL
549153	2011 DE_{29}	—	September 23, 2009	Kitt Peak	Spacewatch	·	1.1 km	MPC · JPL
549154	2011 DL_{31}	—	February 25, 2011	Mount Lemmon	Mount Lemmon Survey	BRA	1.2 km	MPC · JPL
549155	2011 DK_{32}	—	February 1, 2006	Mount Lemmon	Mount Lemmon Survey	·	1.8 km	MPC · JPL
549156	2011 DW_{32}	—	February 25, 2011	Mount Lemmon	Mount Lemmon Survey	·	570 m	MPC · JPL
549157	2011 DZ_{33}	—	September 22, 2009	Mount Lemmon	Mount Lemmon Survey	·	630 m	MPC · JPL
549158	2011 DR_{37}	—	February 25, 2011	Mount Lemmon	Mount Lemmon Survey	KOR	1.2 km	MPC · JPL
549159	2011 DR_{41}	—	February 25, 2011	Mount Lemmon	Mount Lemmon Survey	·	2.9 km	MPC · JPL
549160	2011 DZ_{42}	—	February 26, 2011	Mount Lemmon	Mount Lemmon Survey	·	600 m	MPC · JPL
549161	2011 DG_{43}	—	January 28, 2011	Kitt Peak	Spacewatch	·	1.7 km	MPC · JPL
549162	2011 DZ_{44}	—	September 25, 2008	Mount Lemmon	Mount Lemmon Survey	VER	2.1 km	MPC · JPL
549163	2011 DA_{47}	—	February 4, 2006	Mount Lemmon	Mount Lemmon Survey	·	2.0 km	MPC · JPL
549164	2011 DP_{47}	—	February 26, 2011	Mount Lemmon	Mount Lemmon Survey	·	1.7 km	MPC · JPL
549165	2011 DR_{47}	—	February 8, 2007	Mount Lemmon	Mount Lemmon Survey	·	1.2 km	MPC · JPL
549166	2011 DC_{48}	—	November 7, 2005	Mauna Kea	A. Boattini	(16286)	2.1 km	MPC · JPL
549167	2011 DF_{52}	—	January 31, 2006	Kitt Peak	Spacewatch	·	1.9 km	MPC · JPL
549168	2011 DL_{52}	—	February 10, 2011	Mount Lemmon	Mount Lemmon Survey	·	1.5 km	MPC · JPL
549169	2011 DL_{54}	—	January 26, 2011	Kitt Peak	Spacewatch	·	950 m	MPC · JPL
549170	2011 ES_{2}	—	December 11, 2010	Mount Lemmon	Mount Lemmon Survey	·	710 m	MPC · JPL
549171	2011 EX_{5}	—	August 27, 2005	Palomar	NEAT	V	580 m	MPC · JPL
549172	2011 EK_{12}	—	April 24, 2007	Mount Lemmon	Mount Lemmon Survey	·	2.3 km	MPC · JPL
549173	2011 EF_{14}	—	February 9, 2002	Kitt Peak	Spacewatch	·	1.6 km	MPC · JPL
549174	2011 EG_{15}	—	February 12, 2011	Mount Lemmon	Mount Lemmon Survey	·	1.9 km	MPC · JPL
549175	2011 EG_{21}	—	December 27, 2006	Mount Lemmon	Mount Lemmon Survey	·	1.3 km	MPC · JPL
549176	2011 EQ_{23}	—	October 15, 1995	Kitt Peak	Spacewatch	V	690 m	MPC · JPL
549177	2011 EV_{24}	—	September 16, 2003	Palomar	NEAT	·	1.8 km	MPC · JPL
549178	2011 EN_{26}	—	March 6, 2011	Mount Lemmon	Mount Lemmon Survey	EOS	2.2 km	MPC · JPL
549179	2011 EM_{27}	—	March 6, 2011	Mount Lemmon	Mount Lemmon Survey	·	2.1 km	MPC · JPL
549180	2011 ER_{27}	—	January 8, 2011	Mount Lemmon	Mount Lemmon Survey	TIR	2.2 km	MPC · JPL
549181	2011 EZ_{29}	—	February 10, 2011	Catalina	CSS	H	430 m	MPC · JPL
549182	2011 EG_{30}	—	August 5, 2005	Palomar	NEAT	·	680 m	MPC · JPL
549183	2011 ER_{34}	—	January 25, 2006	Kitt Peak	Spacewatch	·	1.8 km	MPC · JPL
549184	2011 EZ_{41}	—	March 24, 2006	Anderson Mesa	LONEOS	H	430 m	MPC · JPL
549185 Herczeg	2011 EG_{44}	Herczeg	March 8, 2011	Piszkéstető	K. Sárneczky, J. Kelemen	T_{j} (2.98)	2.6 km	MPC · JPL
549186	2011 EY_{44}	—	January 16, 2004	Kitt Peak	Spacewatch	·	590 m	MPC · JPL
549187	2011 EH_{46}	—	March 10, 2011	Kitt Peak	Spacewatch	·	560 m	MPC · JPL
549188	2011 EZ_{47}	—	March 7, 2011	Bergisch Gladbach	W. Bickel	H	570 m	MPC · JPL
549189	2011 EJ_{48}	—	March 9, 2011	Mount Lemmon	Mount Lemmon Survey	·	610 m	MPC · JPL
549190	2011 EE_{50}	—	March 11, 2011	Mayhill-ISON	L. Elenin	·	680 m	MPC · JPL
549191	2011 EA_{52}	—	February 25, 2011	Kitt Peak	Spacewatch	·	600 m	MPC · JPL
549192	2011 EL_{52}	—	March 9, 2011	Mount Lemmon	Mount Lemmon Survey	·	2.0 km	MPC · JPL
549193	2011 ES_{52}	—	March 9, 2011	Mount Lemmon	Mount Lemmon Survey	·	1.5 km	MPC · JPL
549194	2011 ES_{53}	—	March 18, 2004	Kitt Peak	Spacewatch	·	980 m	MPC · JPL
549195	2011 EH_{55}	—	March 11, 2011	Kitt Peak	Spacewatch	·	520 m	MPC · JPL
549196	2011 EM_{55}	—	March 11, 2011	Mayhill	L. Elenin	·	3.1 km	MPC · JPL
549197	2011 EC_{57}	—	September 19, 1998	Apache Point	SDSS Collaboration	EOS	1.7 km	MPC · JPL
549198	2011 EZ_{58}	—	October 2, 2008	Catalina	CSS	·	2.8 km	MPC · JPL
549199	2011 EF_{60}	—	September 29, 2009	Kitt Peak	Spacewatch	·	1.9 km	MPC · JPL
549200	2011 ES_{71}	—	March 10, 2011	Kitt Peak	Spacewatch	·	550 m	MPC · JPL

== 549201–549300 ==
back to top

Designation			Discovery			Properties		Ref
Permanent	Provisional	Named after	Date	Site	Discoverer(s)	Category	Diam.	Ref
549201	2011 EO_{72}	—	February 12, 2004	Kitt Peak	Spacewatch	·	730 m	MPC · JPL
549202	2011 EC_{75}	—	March 1, 2011	Catalina	CSS	H	470 m	MPC · JPL
549203	2011 EE_{78}	—	March 2, 2011	Wildberg	R. Apitzsch	EOS	2.4 km	MPC · JPL
549204	2011 EE_{79}	—	March 10, 2011	Mount Lemmon	Mount Lemmon Survey	·	1.8 km	MPC · JPL
549205	2011 EW_{79}	—	February 22, 2011	Kitt Peak	Spacewatch	·	1.2 km	MPC · JPL
549206	2011 EE_{80}	—	March 14, 2011	Mount Lemmon	Mount Lemmon Survey	·	1.3 km	MPC · JPL
549207	2011 EP_{80}	—	September 3, 2005	Mauna Kea	Veillet, C.	·	1.2 km	MPC · JPL
549208	2011 ED_{81}	—	September 16, 2009	Kitt Peak	Spacewatch	·	670 m	MPC · JPL
549209	2011 EP_{81}	—	March 4, 2011	Mount Lemmon	Mount Lemmon Survey	·	600 m	MPC · JPL
549210	2011 EG_{83}	—	March 14, 2011	Mount Lemmon	Mount Lemmon Survey	·	710 m	MPC · JPL
549211	2011 EF_{89}	—	March 2, 2011	Kitt Peak	Spacewatch	KOR	1.3 km	MPC · JPL
549212	2011 EK_{90}	—	February 2, 2005	Kitt Peak	Spacewatch	·	2.8 km	MPC · JPL
549213	2011 EM_{90}	—	March 10, 2011	Mount Lemmon	Mount Lemmon Survey	·	3.2 km	MPC · JPL
549214	2011 EB_{91}	—	June 12, 2011	Mount Lemmon	Mount Lemmon Survey	PHO	1.0 km	MPC · JPL
549215	2011 EW_{91}	—	September 14, 2013	Haleakala	Pan-STARRS 1	·	2.0 km	MPC · JPL
549216	2011 ES_{95}	—	August 23, 2014	Haleakala	Pan-STARRS 1	·	1.4 km	MPC · JPL
549217	2011 EV_{95}	—	September 22, 2008	Mount Bigelow	CSS	·	2.5 km	MPC · JPL
549218	2011 ED_{96}	—	March 13, 2011	Mount Lemmon	Mount Lemmon Survey	·	1.4 km	MPC · JPL
549219	2011 EK_{97}	—	March 4, 2011	Mount Lemmon	Mount Lemmon Survey	·	470 m	MPC · JPL
549220	2011 EA_{98}	—	March 11, 2011	Kitt Peak	Spacewatch	·	490 m	MPC · JPL
549221	2011 EY_{99}	—	October 3, 2006	Mount Lemmon	Mount Lemmon Survey	·	520 m	MPC · JPL
549222	2011 EN_{100}	—	March 2, 2011	Mount Lemmon	Mount Lemmon Survey	·	1.5 km	MPC · JPL
549223	2011 EO_{100}	—	March 4, 2011	Catalina	CSS	MAS	710 m	MPC · JPL
549224	2011 EZ_{102}	—	March 2, 2011	Mount Lemmon	Mount Lemmon Survey	AGN	1.0 km	MPC · JPL
549225	2011 EB_{103}	—	March 6, 2011	Mount Lemmon	Mount Lemmon Survey	KOR	1.2 km	MPC · JPL
549226	2011 FD_{3}	—	February 16, 2001	Kitt Peak	Spacewatch	·	620 m	MPC · JPL
549227	2011 FT_{4}	—	March 11, 2011	Catalina	CSS	·	1.4 km	MPC · JPL
549228 Labuda	2011 FW_{4}	Labuda	March 24, 2011	Piszkéstető	S. Kürti, K. Sárneczky	·	2.5 km	MPC · JPL
549229 Bánjános	2011 FB_{5}	Bánjános	March 24, 2011	Piszkéstető	S. Kürti, K. Sárneczky	·	2.1 km	MPC · JPL
549230	2011 FK_{5}	—	March 24, 2011	Piszkés-tető	K. Sárneczky, Z. Kuli	EOS	1.9 km	MPC · JPL
549231	2011 FW_{10}	—	October 22, 2003	Apache Point	SDSS	·	2.8 km	MPC · JPL
549232	2011 FF_{11}	—	August 20, 2002	Palomar	NEAT	·	2.5 km	MPC · JPL
549233	2011 FN_{14}	—	March 14, 2011	Kitt Peak	Spacewatch	·	1.4 km	MPC · JPL
549234	2011 FX_{16}	—	March 24, 2011	Piszkés-tető	K. Sárneczky, Z. Kuli	·	2.0 km	MPC · JPL
549235	2011 FQ_{18}	—	March 26, 2011	Mount Lemmon	Mount Lemmon Survey	·	2.0 km	MPC · JPL
549236	2011 FU_{18}	—	March 27, 2011	Kitt Peak	Spacewatch	·	550 m	MPC · JPL
549237	2011 FX_{24}	—	March 29, 2011	Piszkés-tető	K. Sárneczky, Z. Kuli	EOS	1.9 km	MPC · JPL
549238	2011 FB_{25}	—	September 24, 2008	Mount Lemmon	Mount Lemmon Survey	EOS	1.7 km	MPC · JPL
549239	2011 FJ_{25}	—	March 29, 2011	Piszkés-tető	K. Sárneczky, Z. Kuli	·	3.2 km	MPC · JPL
549240	2011 FX_{25}	—	March 29, 2011	Piszkés-tető	K. Sárneczky, Z. Kuli	·	2.1 km	MPC · JPL
549241	2011 FU_{26}	—	March 30, 2011	Piszkés-tető	K. Sárneczky, Z. Kuli	·	1.7 km	MPC · JPL
549242	2011 FL_{27}	—	December 20, 2009	Kitt Peak	Spacewatch	EOS	1.9 km	MPC · JPL
549243	2011 FU_{30}	—	March 27, 2011	Mount Lemmon	Mount Lemmon Survey	·	700 m	MPC · JPL
549244	2011 FT_{34}	—	March 24, 2006	Mount Lemmon	Mount Lemmon Survey	EOS	1.5 km	MPC · JPL
549245	2011 FX_{35}	—	September 17, 2003	Kitt Peak	Spacewatch	KOR	1.6 km	MPC · JPL
549246	2011 FS_{36}	—	March 29, 2011	Mount Lemmon	Mount Lemmon Survey	·	1.7 km	MPC · JPL
549247	2011 FZ_{36}	—	October 8, 2008	Kitt Peak	Spacewatch	KOR	1.6 km	MPC · JPL
549248	2011 FT_{39}	—	March 30, 2011	Mount Lemmon	Mount Lemmon Survey	·	1.6 km	MPC · JPL
549249	2011 FO_{40}	—	March 30, 2011	Piszkés-tető	K. Sárneczky, Z. Kuli	·	2.0 km	MPC · JPL
549250	2011 FA_{44}	—	March 28, 2011	Mount Lemmon	Mount Lemmon Survey	·	570 m	MPC · JPL
549251	2011 FJ_{44}	—	March 28, 2011	Mount Lemmon	Mount Lemmon Survey	·	680 m	MPC · JPL
549252	2011 FH_{45}	—	March 29, 2011	Kitt Peak	Spacewatch	·	660 m	MPC · JPL
549253	2011 FY_{45}	—	September 19, 1998	Apache Point	SDSS	KOR	1.6 km	MPC · JPL
549254	2011 FV_{47}	—	March 29, 2011	Kitt Peak	Spacewatch	·	620 m	MPC · JPL
549255	2011 FB_{51}	—	March 9, 2011	Kitt Peak	Spacewatch	·	1.9 km	MPC · JPL
549256	2011 FR_{51}	—	March 9, 2011	Moletai	K. Černis	·	600 m	MPC · JPL
549257	2011 FL_{60}	—	October 23, 2008	Kitt Peak	Spacewatch	·	2.2 km	MPC · JPL
549258	2011 FD_{62}	—	September 13, 2002	Socorro	LINEAR	·	2.6 km	MPC · JPL
549259	2011 FR_{62}	—	March 30, 2011	Mount Lemmon	Mount Lemmon Survey	V	410 m	MPC · JPL
549260	2011 FC_{65}	—	March 11, 2011	Kitt Peak	Spacewatch	·	2.2 km	MPC · JPL
549261	2011 FM_{65}	—	September 23, 2008	Kitt Peak	Spacewatch	·	1.8 km	MPC · JPL
549262	2011 FZ_{66}	—	March 27, 2011	Mount Lemmon	Mount Lemmon Survey	·	610 m	MPC · JPL
549263	2011 FK_{68}	—	March 27, 2011	Mount Lemmon	Mount Lemmon Survey	V	460 m	MPC · JPL
549264	2011 FN_{73}	—	February 1, 2006	Kitt Peak	Spacewatch	·	2.3 km	MPC · JPL
549265	2011 FD_{75}	—	September 21, 2003	Kitt Peak	Spacewatch	·	1.5 km	MPC · JPL
549266	2011 FJ_{77}	—	October 4, 2006	Mount Lemmon	Mount Lemmon Survey	·	650 m	MPC · JPL
549267	2011 FS_{77}	—	March 29, 2011	Mount Lemmon	Mount Lemmon Survey	·	590 m	MPC · JPL
549268	2011 FK_{80}	—	April 16, 2001	Kitt Peak	Spacewatch	·	1.7 km	MPC · JPL
549269	2011 FO_{80}	—	May 3, 2008	Mount Lemmon	Mount Lemmon Survey	·	600 m	MPC · JPL
549270	2011 FF_{84}	—	March 31, 2011	Mount Lemmon	Mount Lemmon Survey	·	3.0 km	MPC · JPL
549271	2011 FL_{84}	—	August 6, 2005	Palomar	NEAT	·	910 m	MPC · JPL
549272	2011 FF_{86}	—	April 2, 2011	Haleakala	Pan-STARRS 1	·	1.4 km	MPC · JPL
549273	2011 FH_{86}	—	September 19, 2009	Mount Lemmon	Mount Lemmon Survey	·	830 m	MPC · JPL
549274	2011 FO_{89}	—	December 20, 2009	Kitt Peak	Spacewatch	·	2.8 km	MPC · JPL
549275	2011 FO_{90}	—	September 23, 1998	Kitt Peak	Spacewatch	·	1.7 km	MPC · JPL
549276	2011 FS_{93}	—	September 27, 2009	Kitt Peak	Spacewatch	·	640 m	MPC · JPL
549277	2011 FM_{98}	—	December 10, 2004	Kitt Peak	Spacewatch	·	1.3 km	MPC · JPL
549278	2011 FN_{100}	—	August 11, 2002	Palomar	NEAT	·	3.2 km	MPC · JPL
549279	2011 FY_{103}	—	September 24, 2009	Mount Lemmon	Mount Lemmon Survey	·	860 m	MPC · JPL
549280	2011 FN_{105}	—	September 18, 2009	Mount Lemmon	Mount Lemmon Survey	·	730 m	MPC · JPL
549281	2011 FU_{106}	—	April 1, 2011	Mount Lemmon	Mount Lemmon Survey	·	930 m	MPC · JPL
549282	2011 FC_{109}	—	April 5, 2011	Mount Lemmon	Mount Lemmon Survey	·	1.2 km	MPC · JPL
549283	2011 FG_{109}	—	September 13, 2005	Kitt Peak	Spacewatch	·	630 m	MPC · JPL
549284	2011 FY_{109}	—	April 1, 2011	Mount Lemmon	Mount Lemmon Survey	·	730 m	MPC · JPL
549285	2011 FZ_{109}	—	April 15, 1996	Kitt Peak	Spacewatch	·	1.9 km	MPC · JPL
549286	2011 FN_{111}	—	April 1, 2011	Mount Lemmon	Mount Lemmon Survey	EOS	1.7 km	MPC · JPL
549287	2011 FK_{113}	—	September 30, 2009	Mount Lemmon	Mount Lemmon Survey	(2076)	640 m	MPC · JPL
549288	2011 FJ_{115}	—	September 20, 2003	Kitt Peak	Spacewatch	·	2.5 km	MPC · JPL
549289	2011 FE_{116}	—	April 2, 2011	Mount Lemmon	Mount Lemmon Survey	V	550 m	MPC · JPL
549290	2011 FZ_{119}	—	October 24, 2009	Kitt Peak	Spacewatch	·	680 m	MPC · JPL
549291	2011 FM_{121}	—	August 26, 2003	Cerro Tololo	Deep Ecliptic Survey	KOR	1.2 km	MPC · JPL
549292	2011 FN_{124}	—	September 30, 2009	Mount Lemmon	Mount Lemmon Survey	·	630 m	MPC · JPL
549293	2011 FS_{124}	—	April 1, 2011	Mount Lemmon	Mount Lemmon Survey	·	1.7 km	MPC · JPL
549294	2011 FU_{125}	—	November 8, 2009	Mount Lemmon	Mount Lemmon Survey	V	520 m	MPC · JPL
549295	2011 FR_{130}	—	November 9, 2009	Kitt Peak	Spacewatch	·	760 m	MPC · JPL
549296	2011 FK_{133}	—	March 28, 2011	Mount Lemmon	Mount Lemmon Survey	BRA	1.2 km	MPC · JPL
549297	2011 FN_{134}	—	September 18, 2003	Kitt Peak	Spacewatch	·	1.8 km	MPC · JPL
549298	2011 FQ_{136}	—	December 1, 2005	Kitt Peak	Wasserman, L. H., Millis, R. L.	·	2.2 km	MPC · JPL
549299	2011 FN_{138}	—	February 8, 2011	Mount Lemmon	Mount Lemmon Survey	·	750 m	MPC · JPL
549300	2011 FY_{145}	—	May 28, 1997	Kitt Peak	Spacewatch	BRA	1.3 km	MPC · JPL

== 549301–549400 ==
back to top

Designation			Discovery			Properties		Ref
Permanent	Provisional	Named after	Date	Site	Discoverer(s)	Category	Diam.	Ref
549301	2011 FH_{153}	—	February 14, 2004	Kitt Peak	Spacewatch	·	710 m	MPC · JPL
549302	2011 FZ_{156}	—	September 24, 2003	Palomar	NEAT	EOS	2.9 km	MPC · JPL
549303	2011 FX_{159}	—	March 26, 2011	Kitt Peak	Spacewatch	·	850 m	MPC · JPL
549304	2011 FY_{159}	—	June 2, 2016	Haleakala	Pan-STARRS 1	·	1.5 km	MPC · JPL
549305	2011 FG_{160}	—	March 27, 2011	Kitt Peak	Spacewatch	·	2.1 km	MPC · JPL
549306	2011 FO_{160}	—	March 27, 2011	Mount Lemmon	Mount Lemmon Survey	·	1.5 km	MPC · JPL
549307	2011 FO_{164}	—	March 25, 2011	Kitt Peak	Spacewatch	EOS	1.6 km	MPC · JPL
549308	2011 FC_{166}	—	February 11, 2015	Mount Lemmon	Mount Lemmon Survey	·	1.2 km	MPC · JPL
549309	2011 FU_{167}	—	March 30, 2011	Bergisch Gladbach	W. Bickel	EOS	1.5 km	MPC · JPL
549310	2011 GW	—	April 1, 2011	Kitt Peak	Spacewatch	·	1.2 km	MPC · JPL
549311	2011 GM_{5}	—	May 12, 1996	Kitt Peak	Spacewatch	EOS	1.7 km	MPC · JPL
549312	2011 GD_{6}	—	April 2, 2011	Mount Lemmon	Mount Lemmon Survey	·	700 m	MPC · JPL
549313	2011 GF_{7}	—	October 23, 2003	Kitt Peak	Spacewatch	·	1.9 km	MPC · JPL
549314	2011 GG_{7}	—	August 18, 2009	Kitt Peak	Spacewatch	·	880 m	MPC · JPL
549315	2011 GR_{10}	—	November 18, 2006	Kitt Peak	Spacewatch	·	580 m	MPC · JPL
549316	2011 GH_{16}	—	May 4, 2006	Mount Lemmon	Mount Lemmon Survey	·	1.8 km	MPC · JPL
549317	2011 GJ_{16}	—	October 10, 2005	Anderson Mesa	LONEOS	·	830 m	MPC · JPL
549318	2011 GS_{18}	—	October 9, 2008	Mount Lemmon	Mount Lemmon Survey	·	2.6 km	MPC · JPL
549319	2011 GU_{18}	—	March 11, 1996	Kitt Peak	Spacewatch	PHO	870 m	MPC · JPL
549320	2011 GW_{18}	—	April 2, 2011	Mount Lemmon	Mount Lemmon Survey	·	2.0 km	MPC · JPL
549321	2011 GO_{20}	—	April 2, 2011	Mount Lemmon	Mount Lemmon Survey	EOS	1.2 km	MPC · JPL
549322	2011 GT_{20}	—	March 11, 2011	Mount Lemmon	Mount Lemmon Survey	·	2.7 km	MPC · JPL
549323	2011 GW_{22}	—	April 4, 2011	Mount Lemmon	Mount Lemmon Survey	·	2.3 km	MPC · JPL
549324	2011 GM_{23}	—	February 12, 2004	Kitt Peak	Spacewatch	·	600 m	MPC · JPL
549325	2011 GE_{24}	—	April 4, 2011	Mount Lemmon	Mount Lemmon Survey	·	3.0 km	MPC · JPL
549326	2011 GV_{25}	—	October 22, 2009	Mount Lemmon	Mount Lemmon Survey	·	610 m	MPC · JPL
549327	2011 GU_{26}	—	April 4, 2011	Mount Lemmon	Mount Lemmon Survey	·	850 m	MPC · JPL
549328	2011 GO_{27}	—	April 4, 2011	Mount Lemmon	Mount Lemmon Survey	APO	570 m	MPC · JPL
549329	2011 GW_{27}	—	September 26, 2008	Kitt Peak	Spacewatch	EOS	1.8 km	MPC · JPL
549330	2011 GR_{29}	—	April 1, 2011	Kitt Peak	Spacewatch	·	810 m	MPC · JPL
549331	2011 GP_{35}	—	September 5, 2008	Kitt Peak	Spacewatch	·	1.8 km	MPC · JPL
549332	2011 GB_{39}	—	April 4, 2011	Mount Lemmon	Mount Lemmon Survey	·	1.9 km	MPC · JPL
549333	2011 GF_{39}	—	March 27, 2011	Mount Lemmon	Mount Lemmon Survey	·	770 m	MPC · JPL
549334	2011 GF_{42}	—	June 14, 2007	Kitt Peak	Spacewatch	·	2.9 km	MPC · JPL
549335	2011 GN_{43}	—	April 4, 2011	Mount Lemmon	Mount Lemmon Survey	KOR	1.6 km	MPC · JPL
549336	2011 GC_{47}	—	November 17, 2009	Mount Lemmon	Mount Lemmon Survey	·	790 m	MPC · JPL
549337	2011 GE_{47}	—	October 4, 1996	Kitt Peak	Spacewatch	H	540 m	MPC · JPL
549338	2011 GQ_{48}	—	October 27, 2008	Mount Lemmon	Mount Lemmon Survey	·	1.6 km	MPC · JPL
549339	2011 GU_{50}	—	February 25, 2006	Kitt Peak	Spacewatch	KOR	1.3 km	MPC · JPL
549340	2011 GF_{51}	—	September 3, 2008	Kitt Peak	Spacewatch	EOS	1.6 km	MPC · JPL
549341	2011 GB_{53}	—	September 7, 2008	Mount Lemmon	Mount Lemmon Survey	KOR	1.2 km	MPC · JPL
549342	2011 GS_{56}	—	April 6, 2011	Mount Lemmon	Mount Lemmon Survey	·	1.8 km	MPC · JPL
549343	2011 GB_{57}	—	March 17, 2005	Mount Lemmon	Mount Lemmon Survey	·	2.5 km	MPC · JPL
549344	2011 GB_{66}	—	November 20, 2003	Kitt Peak	Spacewatch	·	2.9 km	MPC · JPL
549345	2011 GJ_{66}	—	June 16, 2001	Palomar	NEAT	·	700 m	MPC · JPL
549346	2011 GD_{72}	—	March 25, 2011	Kitt Peak	Spacewatch	H	330 m	MPC · JPL
549347	2011 GG_{72}	—	April 11, 2011	Mount Lemmon	Mount Lemmon Survey	·	830 m	MPC · JPL
549348	2011 GZ_{74}	—	November 8, 2009	Mount Lemmon	Mount Lemmon Survey	·	680 m	MPC · JPL
549349	2011 GK_{76}	—	April 14, 2011	Mount Lemmon	Mount Lemmon Survey	·	3.3 km	MPC · JPL
549350	2011 GB_{77}	—	April 15, 2011	Haleakala	Pan-STARRS 1	·	580 m	MPC · JPL
549351	2011 GD_{77}	—	July 18, 2001	Palomar	NEAT	·	3.3 km	MPC · JPL
549352	2011 GE_{79}	—	April 6, 2011	Kitt Peak	Spacewatch	·	1.2 km	MPC · JPL
549353	2011 GH_{80}	—	December 23, 2006	Vallemare Borbona	V. S. Casulli	V	670 m	MPC · JPL
549354	2011 GK_{83}	—	March 26, 2011	Mount Lemmon	Mount Lemmon Survey	·	660 m	MPC · JPL
549355	2011 GQ_{83}	—	March 27, 2011	Mount Lemmon	Mount Lemmon Survey	·	2.0 km	MPC · JPL
549356	2011 GF_{87}	—	December 2, 2005	Mauna Kea	A. Boattini	·	1.5 km	MPC · JPL
549357	2011 GK_{87}	—	September 14, 2005	Catalina	CSS	·	1.5 km	MPC · JPL
549358	2011 GN_{90}	—	April 1, 2011	Kitt Peak	Spacewatch	·	550 m	MPC · JPL
549359	2011 GQ_{90}	—	April 1, 2011	Kitt Peak	Spacewatch	V	570 m	MPC · JPL
549360	2011 GY_{90}	—	April 12, 2011	Mount Lemmon	Mount Lemmon Survey	PHO	760 m	MPC · JPL
549361	2011 GL_{91}	—	April 5, 2011	Mount Lemmon	Mount Lemmon Survey	(895)	2.8 km	MPC · JPL
549362	2011 GE_{92}	—	April 2, 2011	Mount Lemmon	Mount Lemmon Survey	H	390 m	MPC · JPL
549363	2011 GV_{94}	—	January 10, 2014	Mount Lemmon	Mount Lemmon Survey	·	680 m	MPC · JPL
549364	2011 GJ_{95}	—	April 3, 2011	Haleakala	Pan-STARRS 1	·	770 m	MPC · JPL
549365	2011 GM_{95}	—	February 6, 2014	Mount Lemmon	Mount Lemmon Survey	·	650 m	MPC · JPL
549366	2011 GN_{95}	—	April 13, 2011	Haleakala	Pan-STARRS 1	VER	2.9 km	MPC · JPL
549367	2011 GO_{95}	—	January 27, 2015	Haleakala	Pan-STARRS 1	AEG	2.2 km	MPC · JPL
549368	2011 GE_{97}	—	April 6, 2011	Mount Lemmon	Mount Lemmon Survey	·	1.7 km	MPC · JPL
549369	2011 GC_{98}	—	April 6, 2011	Mount Lemmon	Mount Lemmon Survey	T_{j} (2.97) · 3:2	3.8 km	MPC · JPL
549370	2011 GD_{100}	—	April 3, 2011	Haleakala	Pan-STARRS 1	·	1.6 km	MPC · JPL
549371	2011 GL_{100}	—	April 1, 2011	Mount Lemmon	Mount Lemmon Survey	·	2.4 km	MPC · JPL
549372	2011 GM_{100}	—	April 5, 2011	Kitt Peak	Spacewatch	·	2.0 km	MPC · JPL
549373	2011 GP_{100}	—	April 5, 2011	Kitt Peak	Spacewatch	·	2.6 km	MPC · JPL
549374	2011 GQ_{101}	—	April 12, 2011	Mount Lemmon	Mount Lemmon Survey	·	2.8 km	MPC · JPL
549375	2011 GT_{101}	—	April 6, 2011	Kitt Peak	Spacewatch	MIS	2.2 km	MPC · JPL
549376	2011 GU_{101}	—	April 1, 2011	Kitt Peak	Spacewatch	·	930 m	MPC · JPL
549377	2011 GZ_{102}	—	April 1, 2011	Kitt Peak	Spacewatch	·	2.0 km	MPC · JPL
549378	2011 GM_{103}	—	April 3, 2011	Haleakala	Pan-STARRS 1	·	610 m	MPC · JPL
549379	2011 HK	—	April 22, 2011	Andrushivka	Kyrylenko, P., Y. Ivaščenko	H	390 m	MPC · JPL
549380	2011 HF_{2}	—	April 24, 2011	Haleakala	Pan-STARRS 1	H	390 m	MPC · JPL
549381	2011 HQ_{3}	—	May 24, 2001	Apache Point	SDSS Collaboration	·	1.7 km	MPC · JPL
549382	2011 HD_{4}	—	April 25, 2011	Nogales	Tenagra II	H	540 m	MPC · JPL
549383	2011 HD_{9}	—	December 13, 2006	Kitt Peak	Spacewatch	·	650 m	MPC · JPL
549384	2011 HW_{13}	—	April 23, 2011	Haleakala	Pan-STARRS 1	·	2.4 km	MPC · JPL
549385	2011 HY_{15}	—	April 24, 2011	Mount Lemmon	Mount Lemmon Survey	EOS	1.6 km	MPC · JPL
549386	2011 HB_{16}	—	October 15, 2007	Mount Lemmon	Mount Lemmon Survey	·	2.8 km	MPC · JPL
549387	2011 HM_{17}	—	January 8, 2010	Mount Lemmon	Mount Lemmon Survey	·	2.8 km	MPC · JPL
549388	2011 HH_{19}	—	April 3, 2011	Haleakala	Pan-STARRS 1	·	730 m	MPC · JPL
549389	2011 HM_{21}	—	November 20, 2008	Kitt Peak	Spacewatch	EOS	2.0 km	MPC · JPL
549390	2011 HA_{22}	—	March 13, 2005	Kitt Peak	Spacewatch	·	3.1 km	MPC · JPL
549391	2011 HH_{22}	—	October 26, 2008	Mount Lemmon	Mount Lemmon Survey	·	4.0 km	MPC · JPL
549392	2011 HQ_{28}	—	February 16, 2004	Kitt Peak	Spacewatch	·	800 m	MPC · JPL
549393	2011 HL_{32}	—	July 20, 2001	Palomar	NEAT	·	3.1 km	MPC · JPL
549394	2011 HM_{32}	—	March 25, 2000	Kitt Peak	Spacewatch	·	3.5 km	MPC · JPL
549395	2011 HA_{33}	—	March 26, 2011	Kitt Peak	Spacewatch	·	680 m	MPC · JPL
549396	2011 HP_{34}	—	April 6, 2011	Mount Lemmon	Mount Lemmon Survey	·	590 m	MPC · JPL
549397	2011 HE_{35}	—	April 22, 2011	Kitt Peak	Spacewatch	EOS	1.7 km	MPC · JPL
549398	2011 HM_{37}	—	April 6, 2011	Mount Lemmon	Mount Lemmon Survey	·	740 m	MPC · JPL
549399	2011 HD_{39}	—	November 15, 2009	Mount Lemmon	Mount Lemmon Survey	EOS	2.5 km	MPC · JPL
549400	2011 HR_{39}	—	April 24, 2011	Kitt Peak	Spacewatch	H	370 m	MPC · JPL

== 549401–549500 ==
back to top

Designation			Discovery			Properties		Ref
Permanent	Provisional	Named after	Date	Site	Discoverer(s)	Category	Diam.	Ref
549401	2011 HU_{40}	—	April 26, 2011	Mount Lemmon	Mount Lemmon Survey	·	1.4 km	MPC · JPL
549402	2011 HV_{40}	—	September 15, 2002	Palomar	NEAT	EOS	2.0 km	MPC · JPL
549403	2011 HV_{41}	—	April 24, 2006	Kitt Peak	Spacewatch	·	1.7 km	MPC · JPL
549404	2011 HE_{42}	—	April 27, 2011	Mount Lemmon	Mount Lemmon Survey	·	1.6 km	MPC · JPL
549405	2011 HX_{42}	—	April 6, 2011	Mount Lemmon	Mount Lemmon Survey	V	500 m	MPC · JPL
549406	2011 HB_{43}	—	April 27, 2011	Mount Lemmon	Mount Lemmon Survey	·	740 m	MPC · JPL
549407	2011 HJ_{45}	—	April 27, 2011	Haleakala	Pan-STARRS 1	EMA	2.7 km	MPC · JPL
549408	2011 HF_{47}	—	November 1, 2008	Mount Lemmon	Mount Lemmon Survey	EOS	1.7 km	MPC · JPL
549409	2011 HX_{47}	—	November 20, 2003	Apache Point	SDSS Collaboration	·	2.0 km	MPC · JPL
549410	2011 HD_{49}	—	April 5, 2011	Kitt Peak	Spacewatch	·	520 m	MPC · JPL
549411	2011 HU_{49}	—	April 28, 2011	Haleakala	Pan-STARRS 1	·	950 m	MPC · JPL
549412	2011 HB_{51}	—	April 30, 2011	Kitt Peak	Spacewatch	EOS	2.2 km	MPC · JPL
549413	2011 HJ_{54}	—	April 22, 2011	Kitt Peak	Spacewatch	·	2.6 km	MPC · JPL
549414	2011 HK_{54}	—	October 31, 2002	Apache Point	SDSS Collaboration	·	3.2 km	MPC · JPL
549415	2011 HT_{54}	—	August 24, 2001	Haleakala	NEAT	·	850 m	MPC · JPL
549416	2011 HJ_{55}	—	April 12, 2011	Mount Lemmon	Mount Lemmon Survey	·	3.4 km	MPC · JPL
549417	2011 HE_{58}	—	April 6, 2011	Mount Lemmon	Mount Lemmon Survey	·	1.7 km	MPC · JPL
549418 Andreifesenko	2011 HF_{61}	Andreifesenko	September 23, 2009	Zelenchukskaya Stn	T. V. Krjačko, B. Satovski	H	400 m	MPC · JPL
549419	2011 HA_{65}	—	July 24, 2001	Palomar	NEAT	·	3.9 km	MPC · JPL
549420	2011 HK_{71}	—	November 7, 2005	Mauna Kea	A. Boattini	·	1.5 km	MPC · JPL
549421	2011 HD_{72}	—	April 26, 2011	Kitt Peak	Spacewatch	·	790 m	MPC · JPL
549422	2011 HO_{72}	—	April 22, 2011	Kitt Peak	Spacewatch	·	3.0 km	MPC · JPL
549423	2011 HF_{73}	—	April 27, 2011	Kitt Peak	Spacewatch	·	1.8 km	MPC · JPL
549424	2011 HJ_{74}	—	April 4, 2011	Kitt Peak	Spacewatch	·	1.5 km	MPC · JPL
549425	2011 HS_{74}	—	June 26, 2001	Kitt Peak	Spacewatch	·	580 m	MPC · JPL
549426	2011 HX_{77}	—	April 2, 2011	Kitt Peak	Spacewatch	·	1.7 km	MPC · JPL
549427	2011 HF_{78}	—	December 3, 2002	Palomar	NEAT	VER	3.4 km	MPC · JPL
549428	2011 HA_{79}	—	April 23, 2011	Kitt Peak	Spacewatch	H	480 m	MPC · JPL
549429	2011 HK_{86}	—	January 24, 2007	Bergisch Gladbach	W. Bickel	V	690 m	MPC · JPL
549430	2011 HP_{86}	—	April 6, 2011	Mount Lemmon	Mount Lemmon Survey	·	2.2 km	MPC · JPL
549431	2011 HU_{86}	—	April 26, 2011	Mount Lemmon	Mount Lemmon Survey	EOS	1.5 km	MPC · JPL
549432	2011 HW_{88}	—	January 17, 2009	Mount Lemmon	Mount Lemmon Survey	3:2	5.4 km	MPC · JPL
549433	2011 HY_{88}	—	March 29, 2011	Kitt Peak	Spacewatch	·	1.8 km	MPC · JPL
549434	2011 HE_{94}	—	June 17, 2006	Kitt Peak	Spacewatch	·	2.9 km	MPC · JPL
549435	2011 HN_{94}	—	September 25, 2009	Kitt Peak	Spacewatch	·	610 m	MPC · JPL
549436	2011 HK_{95}	—	November 6, 2005	Mount Lemmon	Mount Lemmon Survey	·	750 m	MPC · JPL
549437	2011 HN_{95}	—	April 27, 2011	Haleakala	Pan-STARRS 1	·	610 m	MPC · JPL
549438	2011 HT_{95}	—	April 12, 2011	Kitt Peak	Spacewatch	·	580 m	MPC · JPL
549439	2011 HG_{97}	—	April 13, 2011	Mount Lemmon	Mount Lemmon Survey	V	530 m	MPC · JPL
549440	2011 HH_{97}	—	April 28, 2011	Kitt Peak	Spacewatch	EOS	1.7 km	MPC · JPL
549441	2011 HR_{98}	—	April 2, 2006	Kitt Peak	Spacewatch	·	1.6 km	MPC · JPL
549442	2011 HV_{99}	—	April 30, 2011	Haleakala	Pan-STARRS 1	EOS	1.9 km	MPC · JPL
549443	2011 HF_{101}	—	April 22, 2011	Kitt Peak	Spacewatch	·	600 m	MPC · JPL
549444	2011 HL_{104}	—	April 11, 2005	Mount Lemmon	Mount Lemmon Survey	THM	2.3 km	MPC · JPL
549445	2011 HS_{104}	—	February 5, 2016	Haleakala	Pan-STARRS 1	·	2.5 km	MPC · JPL
549446	2011 HV_{104}	—	April 30, 2011	Haleakala	Pan-STARRS 1	V	460 m	MPC · JPL
549447	2011 HD_{105}	—	December 12, 2012	Mount Lemmon	Mount Lemmon Survey	H	520 m	MPC · JPL
549448	2011 HF_{105}	—	January 25, 2014	Haleakala	Pan-STARRS 1	·	970 m	MPC · JPL
549449	2011 HZ_{105}	—	April 28, 2011	Kitt Peak	Spacewatch	·	1.9 km	MPC · JPL
549450	2011 HV_{106}	—	April 27, 2011	Mount Lemmon	Mount Lemmon Survey	·	2.7 km	MPC · JPL
549451	2011 HZ_{106}	—	September 12, 2013	Catalina	CSS	(69559)	3.7 km	MPC · JPL
549452	2011 HB_{107}	—	October 8, 2012	Mount Lemmon	Mount Lemmon Survey	·	780 m	MPC · JPL
549453	2011 HK_{107}	—	November 20, 2016	Mount Lemmon	Mount Lemmon Survey	V	710 m	MPC · JPL
549454	2011 HQ_{107}	—	September 14, 2013	Haleakala	Pan-STARRS 1	·	2.7 km	MPC · JPL
549455	2011 HT_{107}	—	April 29, 2011	Mount Lemmon	Mount Lemmon Survey	·	2.7 km	MPC · JPL
549456	2011 HB_{108}	—	October 25, 2013	Mount Lemmon	Mount Lemmon Survey	EOS	1.6 km	MPC · JPL
549457	2011 HO_{108}	—	November 4, 2013	Haleakala	Pan-STARRS 1	·	2.6 km	MPC · JPL
549458	2011 HQ_{109}	—	April 30, 2011	Mount Lemmon	Mount Lemmon Survey	·	540 m	MPC · JPL
549459	2011 JX_{1}	—	May 2, 2011	Catalina	CSS	APO +1km	900 m	MPC · JPL
549460	2011 JB_{3}	—	April 26, 2011	Kitt Peak	Spacewatch	·	910 m	MPC · JPL
549461	2011 JX_{5}	—	May 1, 2011	Haleakala	Pan-STARRS 1	·	3.0 km	MPC · JPL
549462	2011 JR_{7}	—	September 27, 2006	Kitt Peak	Spacewatch	·	3.2 km	MPC · JPL
549463	2011 JQ_{9}	—	March 25, 2011	Kitt Peak	Spacewatch	·	700 m	MPC · JPL
549464	2011 JO_{16}	—	January 1, 2003	La Silla	La Silla	·	2.5 km	MPC · JPL
549465	2011 JE_{17}	—	November 18, 2007	Mount Lemmon	Mount Lemmon Survey	·	2.9 km	MPC · JPL
549466	2011 JP_{18}	—	February 15, 2010	Mount Lemmon	Mount Lemmon Survey	EOS	1.7 km	MPC · JPL
549467	2011 JK_{19}	—	March 12, 2010	Kitt Peak	Spacewatch	·	3.1 km	MPC · JPL
549468	2011 JN_{19}	—	May 1, 2011	Haleakala	Pan-STARRS 1	·	1.7 km	MPC · JPL
549469	2011 JH_{20}	—	March 27, 2011	Kitt Peak	Spacewatch	·	590 m	MPC · JPL
549470	2011 JL_{20}	—	May 3, 2011	Kitt Peak	Spacewatch	·	2.8 km	MPC · JPL
549471	2011 JZ_{21}	—	October 31, 2008	Kitt Peak	Spacewatch	·	2.5 km	MPC · JPL
549472	2011 JS_{22}	—	April 2, 2005	Mount Lemmon	Mount Lemmon Survey	·	2.6 km	MPC · JPL
549473	2011 JF_{23}	—	May 1, 2011	Haleakala	Pan-STARRS 1	EOS	2.0 km	MPC · JPL
549474	2011 JD_{24}	—	February 16, 2010	Kitt Peak	Spacewatch	EOS	1.7 km	MPC · JPL
549475	2011 JQ_{30}	—	May 13, 2011	Nogales	M. Schwartz, P. R. Holvorcem	·	1.4 km	MPC · JPL
549476	2011 JJ_{32}	—	September 13, 2007	Mount Lemmon	Mount Lemmon Survey	·	2.4 km	MPC · JPL
549477	2011 JV_{32}	—	December 3, 2008	Kitt Peak	Spacewatch	EOS	1.7 km	MPC · JPL
549478	2011 JG_{33}	—	May 3, 2011	Mount Lemmon	Mount Lemmon Survey	·	3.0 km	MPC · JPL
549479	2011 JM_{33}	—	January 9, 2014	Haleakala	Pan-STARRS 1	·	660 m	MPC · JPL
549480	2011 JQ_{33}	—	May 11, 2011	Kitt Peak	Spacewatch	·	3.0 km	MPC · JPL
549481	2011 JJ_{34}	—	October 20, 2012	Catalina	CSS	·	1.5 km	MPC · JPL
549482	2011 JK_{35}	—	August 25, 2012	Haleakala	Pan-STARRS 1	·	2.6 km	MPC · JPL
549483	2011 JA_{37}	—	May 6, 2011	Kitt Peak	Spacewatch	·	2.6 km	MPC · JPL
549484	2011 JC_{37}	—	May 13, 2011	Mount Lemmon	Mount Lemmon Survey	EOS	1.7 km	MPC · JPL
549485	2011 KR	—	November 20, 2008	Kitt Peak	Spacewatch	·	2.8 km	MPC · JPL
549486	2011 KB_{2}	—	May 21, 2011	Haleakala	Pan-STARRS 1	·	3.1 km	MPC · JPL
549487	2011 KV_{2}	—	August 25, 2008	Hibiscus	Teamo, N., S. F. Hönig	·	690 m	MPC · JPL
549488	2011 KT_{3}	—	May 13, 2011	Nogales	M. Schwartz, P. R. Holvorcem	·	1.8 km	MPC · JPL
549489	2011 KZ_{7}	—	October 27, 2005	Kitt Peak	Spacewatch	·	740 m	MPC · JPL
549490	2011 KO_{8}	—	October 15, 2001	Palomar	NEAT	·	2.8 km	MPC · JPL
549491	2011 KX_{8}	—	August 20, 2006	Palomar	NEAT	·	3.1 km	MPC · JPL
549492	2011 KC_{9}	—	October 1, 2008	Mount Lemmon	Mount Lemmon Survey	·	1.1 km	MPC · JPL
549493	2011 KD_{9}	—	January 27, 2007	Kitt Peak	Spacewatch	·	810 m	MPC · JPL
549494	2011 KQ_{9}	—	September 25, 2003	Palomar	NEAT	JUN	920 m	MPC · JPL
549495	2011 KY_{12}	—	January 17, 2007	Palomar	NEAT	·	750 m	MPC · JPL
549496	2011 KE_{13}	—	May 25, 2011	Nogales	M. Schwartz, P. R. Holvorcem	·	1.4 km	MPC · JPL
549497	2011 KW_{13}	—	February 1, 2005	Catalina	CSS	·	3.5 km	MPC · JPL
549498	2011 KK_{17}	—	May 27, 2011	Nogales	M. Schwartz, P. R. Holvorcem	H	470 m	MPC · JPL
549499	2011 KN_{24}	—	May 30, 2011	Haleakala	Pan-STARRS 1	H	420 m	MPC · JPL
549500	2011 KT_{25}	—	January 17, 2007	Kitt Peak	Spacewatch	·	660 m	MPC · JPL

== 549501–549600 ==
back to top

Designation			Discovery			Properties		Ref
Permanent	Provisional	Named after	Date	Site	Discoverer(s)	Category	Diam.	Ref
549501	2011 KW_{25}	—	April 5, 2011	Mount Lemmon	Mount Lemmon Survey	·	900 m	MPC · JPL
549502	2011 KO_{27}	—	May 22, 2011	Mount Lemmon	Mount Lemmon Survey	·	580 m	MPC · JPL
549503	2011 KY_{28}	—	April 30, 2000	Haleakala	NEAT	·	3.0 km	MPC · JPL
549504	2011 KH_{29}	—	November 29, 2003	Kitt Peak	Spacewatch	·	3.0 km	MPC · JPL
549505	2011 KA_{30}	—	May 22, 2011	Mount Lemmon	Mount Lemmon Survey	·	840 m	MPC · JPL
549506	2011 KL_{33}	—	April 16, 2005	Catalina	CSS	TIR	2.9 km	MPC · JPL
549507	2011 KC_{34}	—	April 11, 2002	Palomar	NEAT	·	1.8 km	MPC · JPL
549508	2011 KS_{36}	—	January 30, 2011	Haleakala	Pan-STARRS 1	·	3.3 km	MPC · JPL
549509	2011 KK_{38}	—	May 5, 2011	Mount Lemmon	Mount Lemmon Survey	V	700 m	MPC · JPL
549510	2011 KQ_{38}	—	March 28, 2011	Kitt Peak	Spacewatch	·	2.7 km	MPC · JPL
549511	2011 KO_{40}	—	March 13, 2007	Mount Lemmon	Mount Lemmon Survey	·	1.3 km	MPC · JPL
549512	2011 KG_{41}	—	March 17, 2005	Mount Lemmon	Mount Lemmon Survey	·	2.4 km	MPC · JPL
549513	2011 KJ_{41}	—	May 24, 2011	Haleakala	Pan-STARRS 1	(2076)	800 m	MPC · JPL
549514	2011 KF_{42}	—	November 18, 2008	Kitt Peak	Spacewatch	·	2.0 km	MPC · JPL
549515	2011 KM_{44}	—	June 19, 2006	Mount Lemmon	Mount Lemmon Survey	TIR	2.6 km	MPC · JPL
549516	2011 KP_{48}	—	March 17, 2005	Mount Lemmon	Mount Lemmon Survey	·	3.6 km	MPC · JPL
549517	2011 KG_{49}	—	December 25, 2006	Kitt Peak	Spacewatch	·	730 m	MPC · JPL
549518	2011 KT_{49}	—	May 24, 2011	Haleakala	Pan-STARRS 1	EOS	1.6 km	MPC · JPL
549519	2011 KK_{52}	—	November 2, 2013	Mount Lemmon	Mount Lemmon Survey	·	3.4 km	MPC · JPL
549520	2011 KM_{52}	—	May 26, 2011	Mount Lemmon	Mount Lemmon Survey	EOS	1.9 km	MPC · JPL
549521	2011 KT_{52}	—	August 25, 2012	Haleakala	Pan-STARRS 1	·	910 m	MPC · JPL
549522	2011 KH_{53}	—	August 14, 2012	Haleakala	Pan-STARRS 1	·	2.4 km	MPC · JPL
549523	2011 KM_{53}	—	May 25, 2011	Mount Lemmon	Mount Lemmon Survey	·	2.4 km	MPC · JPL
549524	2011 KU_{54}	—	October 5, 2013	Haleakala	Pan-STARRS 1	·	2.3 km	MPC · JPL
549525	2011 KX_{54}	—	May 31, 2011	Mount Lemmon	Mount Lemmon Survey	·	2.8 km	MPC · JPL
549526	2011 LH_{3}	—	June 4, 2011	Mount Lemmon	Mount Lemmon Survey	·	1.9 km	MPC · JPL
549527	2011 LK_{3}	—	June 4, 2011	Mount Lemmon	Mount Lemmon Survey	·	2.0 km	MPC · JPL
549528	2011 LX_{3}	—	June 4, 2011	Mount Lemmon	Mount Lemmon Survey	·	670 m	MPC · JPL
549529	2011 LD_{4}	—	June 4, 2011	Kitt Peak	Spacewatch	·	2.2 km	MPC · JPL
549530	2011 LS_{4}	—	October 28, 2005	Kitt Peak	Spacewatch	·	630 m	MPC · JPL
549531	2011 LC_{5}	—	December 31, 2008	Mount Lemmon	Mount Lemmon Survey	·	3.9 km	MPC · JPL
549532	2011 LW_{5}	—	June 3, 2011	Mount Lemmon	Mount Lemmon Survey	·	1.2 km	MPC · JPL
549533	2011 LL_{6}	—	June 4, 2011	Mount Lemmon	Mount Lemmon Survey	·	840 m	MPC · JPL
549534	2011 LU_{7}	—	December 2, 2008	Kitt Peak	Spacewatch	·	3.0 km	MPC · JPL
549535	2011 LZ_{7}	—	May 21, 2011	Haleakala	Pan-STARRS 1	AEG	2.8 km	MPC · JPL
549536	2011 LA_{9}	—	May 21, 2011	Mount Lemmon	Mount Lemmon Survey	·	3.1 km	MPC · JPL
549537	2011 LR_{12}	—	June 7, 2011	Mount Lemmon	Mount Lemmon Survey	·	1.1 km	MPC · JPL
549538	2011 LV_{13}	—	June 3, 2011	Nogales	M. Schwartz, P. R. Holvorcem	MAR	1.2 km	MPC · JPL
549539	2011 LG_{14}	—	May 12, 2011	Nogales	M. Schwartz, P. R. Holvorcem	·	2.4 km	MPC · JPL
549540	2011 LP_{15}	—	June 7, 2011	Haleakala	Pan-STARRS 1	EUN	850 m	MPC · JPL
549541	2011 LD_{16}	—	May 23, 2011	Mount Lemmon	Mount Lemmon Survey	·	980 m	MPC · JPL
549542	2011 LQ_{17}	—	June 8, 2011	Nogales	M. Schwartz, P. R. Holvorcem	H	480 m	MPC · JPL
549543	2011 LF_{20}	—	July 31, 2006	Siding Spring	SSS	H	470 m	MPC · JPL
549544	2011 LN_{22}	—	May 27, 2011	Kitt Peak	Spacewatch	·	1.2 km	MPC · JPL
549545	2011 LV_{22}	—	June 4, 2011	Mount Lemmon	Mount Lemmon Survey	3:2	3.7 km	MPC · JPL
549546	2011 LX_{23}	—	May 28, 2011	Mount Lemmon	Mount Lemmon Survey	·	2.9 km	MPC · JPL
549547	2011 LY_{23}	—	November 8, 2008	Kitt Peak	Spacewatch	·	2.5 km	MPC · JPL
549548	2011 LA_{24}	—	September 15, 2007	Kitt Peak	Spacewatch	·	2.6 km	MPC · JPL
549549	2011 LW_{25}	—	May 22, 2011	Mount Lemmon	Mount Lemmon Survey	EOS	1.5 km	MPC · JPL
549550	2011 LY_{25}	—	December 1, 2008	Kitt Peak	Spacewatch	·	2.0 km	MPC · JPL
549551	2011 LZ_{29}	—	August 10, 2012	Kitt Peak	Spacewatch	·	2.5 km	MPC · JPL
549552	2011 LV_{30}	—	September 17, 1995	Kitt Peak	Spacewatch	·	1.1 km	MPC · JPL
549553	2011 LB_{31}	—	March 28, 2015	Haleakala	Pan-STARRS 1	·	1.2 km	MPC · JPL
549554	2011 LK_{31}	—	June 4, 2011	Mount Lemmon	Mount Lemmon Survey	·	2.7 km	MPC · JPL
549555	2011 LL_{32}	—	January 23, 2015	Haleakala	Pan-STARRS 1	EOS	1.8 km	MPC · JPL
549556	2011 LW_{32}	—	January 9, 2007	Kitt Peak	Spacewatch	·	630 m	MPC · JPL
549557	2011 LH_{33}	—	October 16, 2012	Mount Lemmon	Mount Lemmon Survey	·	880 m	MPC · JPL
549558	2011 LD_{34}	—	June 4, 2011	Mount Lemmon	Mount Lemmon Survey	EOS	1.8 km	MPC · JPL
549559	2011 LA_{35}	—	June 4, 2011	Mount Lemmon	Mount Lemmon Survey	EOS	1.7 km	MPC · JPL
549560	2011 MP	—	June 23, 2011	Nogales	M. Schwartz, P. R. Holvorcem	·	680 m	MPC · JPL
549561	2011 MX_{1}	—	July 8, 2003	Palomar	NEAT	·	1.1 km	MPC · JPL
549562	2011 MN_{3}	—	June 10, 2011	Mount Lemmon	Mount Lemmon Survey	EOS	1.6 km	MPC · JPL
549563	2011 MA_{6}	—	May 29, 2011	Mount Lemmon	Mount Lemmon Survey	·	1.0 km	MPC · JPL
549564	2011 MZ_{6}	—	July 18, 2004	Campo Imperatore	CINEOS	·	960 m	MPC · JPL
549565	2011 MR_{7}	—	June 22, 2011	Mount Lemmon	Mount Lemmon Survey	·	1.8 km	MPC · JPL
549566	2011 MZ_{11}	—	June 28, 2011	Mount Lemmon	Mount Lemmon Survey	VER	2.4 km	MPC · JPL
549567	2011 MV_{12}	—	June 23, 2011	Mount Lemmon	Mount Lemmon Survey	PHO	850 m	MPC · JPL
549568	2011 MZ_{12}	—	June 22, 2011	Mount Lemmon	Mount Lemmon Survey	·	760 m	MPC · JPL
549569	2011 MB_{13}	—	December 9, 2012	Haleakala	Pan-STARRS 1	PHO	1 km	MPC · JPL
549570	2011 MP_{13}	—	February 24, 2014	Haleakala	Pan-STARRS 1	·	850 m	MPC · JPL
549571	2011 ML_{15}	—	June 22, 2011	Mount Lemmon	Mount Lemmon Survey	·	1.1 km	MPC · JPL
549572	2011 NF	—	July 1, 2011	Mount Lemmon	Mount Lemmon Survey	(2076)	650 m	MPC · JPL
549573	2011 NH_{5}	—	January 9, 2013	Kitt Peak	Spacewatch	H	420 m	MPC · JPL
549574	2011 NE_{6}	—	July 2, 2011	Mount Lemmon	Mount Lemmon Survey	·	1.1 km	MPC · JPL
549575	2011 OF_{5}	—	January 30, 2009	Mount Lemmon	Mount Lemmon Survey	·	2.5 km	MPC · JPL
549576	2011 ON_{6}	—	February 18, 2010	Kitt Peak	Spacewatch	·	1.1 km	MPC · JPL
549577	2011 OE_{10}	—	October 4, 2002	Palomar	NEAT	·	1.3 km	MPC · JPL
549578	2011 OT_{10}	—	July 31, 2003	Campo Imperatore	CINEOS	·	1.6 km	MPC · JPL
549579	2011 OR_{12}	—	December 31, 2008	Catalina	CSS	HNS	1.1 km	MPC · JPL
549580	2011 OR_{13}	—	July 25, 2011	Haleakala	Pan-STARRS 1	·	850 m	MPC · JPL
549581	2011 OJ_{19}	—	December 29, 2008	Kitt Peak	Spacewatch	RAF	860 m	MPC · JPL
549582	2011 OG_{20}	—	July 22, 2011	Haleakala	Pan-STARRS 1	H	550 m	MPC · JPL
549583	2011 OL_{20}	—	July 22, 2011	Haleakala	Pan-STARRS 1	·	1.6 km	MPC · JPL
549584	2011 OL_{27}	—	July 28, 2011	Haleakala	Pan-STARRS 1	·	1.6 km	MPC · JPL
549585	2011 OZ_{27}	—	December 5, 2007	Kitt Peak	Spacewatch	·	3.3 km	MPC · JPL
549586	2011 OK_{30}	—	July 28, 2011	Haleakala	Pan-STARRS 1	·	3.1 km	MPC · JPL
549587	2011 OL_{31}	—	July 7, 2011	Siding Spring	SSS	·	1.6 km	MPC · JPL
549588	2011 OH_{34}	—	July 28, 2011	Haleakala	Pan-STARRS 1	·	2.5 km	MPC · JPL
549589	2011 OK_{34}	—	July 28, 2011	Haleakala	Pan-STARRS 1	·	1.9 km	MPC · JPL
549590	2011 OQ_{35}	—	February 19, 2010	Kitt Peak	Spacewatch	·	2.1 km	MPC · JPL
549591	2011 OO_{36}	—	August 1, 2011	Haleakala	Pan-STARRS 1	·	1.2 km	MPC · JPL
549592	2011 OX_{36}	—	December 1, 2008	Kitt Peak	Spacewatch	·	1.0 km	MPC · JPL
549593	2011 OR_{37}	—	July 7, 2011	Siding Spring	SSS	·	580 m	MPC · JPL
549594	2011 OO_{38}	—	January 25, 2009	Kitt Peak	Spacewatch	·	2.6 km	MPC · JPL
549595	2011 OV_{38}	—	June 22, 2011	Mount Lemmon	Mount Lemmon Survey	·	2.9 km	MPC · JPL
549596	2011 OM_{40}	—	October 26, 2008	Kitt Peak	Spacewatch	·	1.1 km	MPC · JPL
549597	2011 OU_{40}	—	July 26, 2011	Haleakala	Pan-STARRS 1	JUN	830 m	MPC · JPL
549598	2011 OC_{44}	—	July 31, 2011	Haleakala	Pan-STARRS 1	·	1.1 km	MPC · JPL
549599	2011 OM_{44}	—	November 12, 2001	Apache Point	SDSS	V	740 m	MPC · JPL
549600	2011 OS_{45}	—	December 31, 2008	Mount Lemmon	Mount Lemmon Survey	·	2.5 km	MPC · JPL

== 549601–549700 ==
back to top

Designation			Discovery			Properties		Ref
Permanent	Provisional	Named after	Date	Site	Discoverer(s)	Category	Diam.	Ref
549601	2011 OR_{48}	—	March 15, 2007	Mount Lemmon	Mount Lemmon Survey	·	1.1 km	MPC · JPL
549602	2011 OO_{50}	—	July 31, 2011	Haleakala	Pan-STARRS 1	·	2.6 km	MPC · JPL
549603	2011 ON_{51}	—	August 23, 2004	Kitt Peak	Spacewatch	·	680 m	MPC · JPL
549604	2011 OS_{51}	—	May 9, 2005	Kitt Peak	Spacewatch	·	2.7 km	MPC · JPL
549605	2011 OM_{52}	—	May 13, 2007	Mount Lemmon	Mount Lemmon Survey	·	980 m	MPC · JPL
549606	2011 OY_{53}	—	June 22, 2011	Kitt Peak	Spacewatch	·	1.1 km	MPC · JPL
549607	2011 OA_{55}	—	July 26, 2011	Haleakala	Pan-STARRS 1	EUN	1.0 km	MPC · JPL
549608	2011 OQ_{55}	—	May 20, 2005	Palomar	NEAT	·	3.2 km	MPC · JPL
549609	2011 OO_{61}	—	November 13, 2012	Kitt Peak	Spacewatch	·	1.4 km	MPC · JPL
549610	2011 OP_{61}	—	October 3, 2016	Oukaïmeden	M. Ory	·	1.5 km	MPC · JPL
549611	2011 OY_{61}	—	October 10, 2012	Mount Lemmon	Mount Lemmon Survey	·	2.9 km	MPC · JPL
549612	2011 OB_{62}	—	February 5, 2013	Kitt Peak	Spacewatch	·	1.1 km	MPC · JPL
549613	2011 OF_{63}	—	June 15, 2015	Haleakala	Pan-STARRS 1	·	1.1 km	MPC · JPL
549614	2011 OY_{63}	—	December 6, 2012	Kitt Peak	Spacewatch	·	1.3 km	MPC · JPL
549615	2011 OR_{65}	—	August 9, 2015	Haleakala	Pan-STARRS 1	·	1.0 km	MPC · JPL
549616	2011 OS_{66}	—	December 24, 2017	Haleakala	Pan-STARRS 1	·	1.4 km	MPC · JPL
549617	2011 OD_{67}	—	July 27, 2011	Haleakala	Pan-STARRS 1	·	3.1 km	MPC · JPL
549618	2011 OC_{70}	—	July 28, 2011	Haleakala	Pan-STARRS 1	·	2.8 km	MPC · JPL
549619	2011 PM	—	March 2, 2005	Kitt Peak	Spacewatch	H	430 m	MPC · JPL
549620	2011 PV_{3}	—	August 1, 2011	Haleakala	Pan-STARRS 1	H	390 m	MPC · JPL
549621	2011 PD_{6}	—	August 3, 2011	Haleakala	Pan-STARRS 1	·	1.4 km	MPC · JPL
549622	2011 PA_{8}	—	August 6, 2011	Haleakala	Pan-STARRS 1	·	1.5 km	MPC · JPL
549623	2011 PZ_{11}	—	July 28, 2011	Haleakala	Pan-STARRS 1	·	600 m	MPC · JPL
549624	2011 PT_{13}	—	August 6, 2011	Haleakala	Pan-STARRS 1	H	450 m	MPC · JPL
549625	2011 PV_{17}	—	November 7, 2012	Mount Lemmon	Mount Lemmon Survey	HNS	1.1 km	MPC · JPL
549626	2011 PE_{19}	—	August 4, 2011	Haleakala	Pan-STARRS 1	·	920 m	MPC · JPL
549627	2011 PG_{19}	—	July 25, 2015	Haleakala	Pan-STARRS 1	·	1.1 km	MPC · JPL
549628	2011 QM	—	January 9, 2007	Kitt Peak	Spacewatch	H	390 m	MPC · JPL
549629	2011 QL_{1}	—	November 8, 2007	Kitt Peak	Spacewatch	·	1.3 km	MPC · JPL
549630	2011 QM_{5}	—	October 19, 2003	Palomar	NEAT	EUN	940 m	MPC · JPL
549631	2011 QR_{9}	—	August 20, 2011	Haleakala	Pan-STARRS 1	·	1.3 km	MPC · JPL
549632	2011 QH_{10}	—	August 20, 2011	Haleakala	Pan-STARRS 1	·	3.3 km	MPC · JPL
549633	2011 QF_{11}	—	August 16, 2002	Kitt Peak	Spacewatch	·	1.7 km	MPC · JPL
549634	2011 QW_{12}	—	August 4, 2011	La Sagra	OAM	H	610 m	MPC · JPL
549635	2011 QD_{13}	—	August 4, 2002	Palomar	NEAT	·	1.5 km	MPC · JPL
549636	2011 QM_{15}	—	August 23, 2011	Haleakala	Pan-STARRS 1	·	1.6 km	MPC · JPL
549637	2011 QN_{16}	—	August 24, 2011	Sandlot	G. Hug	H	510 m	MPC · JPL
549638	2011 QY_{17}	—	January 30, 2003	Palomar	NEAT	EOS	3.2 km	MPC · JPL
549639	2011 QK_{24}	—	August 20, 2011	Haleakala	Pan-STARRS 1	·	990 m	MPC · JPL
549640	2011 QN_{27}	—	August 22, 2011	Črni Vrh	Matičič, S.	HNS	1.1 km	MPC · JPL
549641	2011 QG_{29}	—	July 12, 2005	Mount Lemmon	Mount Lemmon Survey	·	3.1 km	MPC · JPL
549642	2011 QB_{33}	—	November 1, 2008	Mount Lemmon	Mount Lemmon Survey	·	1.1 km	MPC · JPL
549643	2011 QQ_{34}	—	August 25, 2011	La Sagra	OAM	·	1.4 km	MPC · JPL
549644	2011 QB_{35}	—	August 26, 2011	Kitt Peak	Spacewatch	·	1.5 km	MPC · JPL
549645	2011 QD_{36}	—	April 27, 2006	Cerro Tololo	Deep Ecliptic Survey	NYS	850 m	MPC · JPL
549646	2011 QQ_{37}	—	August 1, 2000	Socorro	LINEAR	·	1 km	MPC · JPL
549647	2011 QW_{38}	—	April 10, 2010	Mount Lemmon	Mount Lemmon Survey	·	2.3 km	MPC · JPL
549648 Shirokov	2011 QA_{39}	Shirokov	August 27, 2011	Zelenchukskaya Stn	T. V. Krjačko, Satovski, B.	ADE	1.5 km	MPC · JPL
549649	2011 QR_{39}	—	August 28, 2011	Haleakala	Pan-STARRS 1	EUN	940 m	MPC · JPL
549650 Bilibin	2011 QR_{45}	Bilibin	August 28, 2011	Zelenchukskaya Stn	T. V. Krjačko, Satovski, B.	·	1.5 km	MPC · JPL
549651	2011 QL_{48}	—	April 9, 2010	Mount Lemmon	Mount Lemmon Survey	EUN	980 m	MPC · JPL
549652	2011 QM_{48}	—	February 26, 2008	Mount Lemmon	Mount Lemmon Survey	·	3.8 km	MPC · JPL
549653	2011 QA_{51}	—	September 14, 2007	Mount Lemmon	Mount Lemmon Survey	·	1.7 km	MPC · JPL
549654	2011 QU_{52}	—	August 19, 2011	Haleakala	Pan-STARRS 1	·	1.2 km	MPC · JPL
549655	2011 QE_{54}	—	February 9, 2007	Catalina	CSS	H	530 m	MPC · JPL
549656	2011 QS_{56}	—	August 28, 2011	Haleakala	Pan-STARRS 1	EUN	910 m	MPC · JPL
549657	2011 QZ_{59}	—	August 30, 2011	Haleakala	Pan-STARRS 1	H	540 m	MPC · JPL
549658	2011 QD_{61}	—	September 27, 1997	Kitt Peak	Spacewatch	·	730 m	MPC · JPL
549659	2011 QB_{63}	—	September 28, 2002	Haleakala	NEAT	·	2.2 km	MPC · JPL
549660	2011 QW_{64}	—	November 18, 2007	Sierra Vista	D. Healy	·	2.0 km	MPC · JPL
549661	2011 QY_{64}	—	August 4, 2011	Siding Spring	SSS	·	3.7 km	MPC · JPL
549662	2011 QP_{65}	—	August 25, 2000	Cerro Tololo	Deep Ecliptic Survey	L5	10 km	MPC · JPL
549663 Barczaszabolcs	2011 QR_{66}	Barczaszabolcs	August 10, 2011	Piszkéstető	K. Sárneczky, A. Pál	V	670 m	MPC · JPL
549664	2011 QG_{72}	—	August 29, 2011	Siding Spring	SSS	·	940 m	MPC · JPL
549665	2011 QM_{72}	—	August 30, 2011	Haleakala	Pan-STARRS 1	·	1.7 km	MPC · JPL
549666	2011 QZ_{72}	—	August 30, 2011	Calvin-Rehoboth	L. A. Molnar	·	1.4 km	MPC · JPL
549667	2011 QW_{74}	—	August 21, 2011	Haleakala	Pan-STARRS 1	·	3.2 km	MPC · JPL
549668	2011 QO_{76}	—	August 23, 2011	Haleakala	Pan-STARRS 1	MAS	790 m	MPC · JPL
549669	2011 QT_{86}	—	January 31, 2009	Mount Lemmon	Mount Lemmon Survey	·	2.8 km	MPC · JPL
549670	2011 QR_{88}	—	June 17, 2010	Mount Lemmon	Mount Lemmon Survey	·	3.1 km	MPC · JPL
549671	2011 QJ_{92}	—	August 30, 2011	Haleakala	Pan-STARRS 1	·	1.3 km	MPC · JPL
549672	2011 QL_{93}	—	April 19, 2006	Mount Lemmon	Mount Lemmon Survey	·	1.3 km	MPC · JPL
549673	2011 QG_{97}	—	August 30, 2011	La Sagra	OAM	·	1.0 km	MPC · JPL
549674	2011 QK_{97}	—	August 31, 2011	Piszkéstető	K. Sárneczky	·	1.6 km	MPC · JPL
549675	2011 QP_{103}	—	August 29, 2002	Palomar	NEAT	·	1.4 km	MPC · JPL
549676 Thanjavur	2011 QB_{105}	Thanjavur	March 16, 2004	Mauna Kea	D. D. Balam	·	1.4 km	MPC · JPL
549677	2011 QG_{105}	—	March 23, 2014	Kitt Peak	Spacewatch	PHO	1.0 km	MPC · JPL
549678	2011 QH_{105}	—	January 7, 2013	Haleakala	Pan-STARRS 1	·	1.7 km	MPC · JPL
549679	2011 QB_{106}	—	April 30, 2014	Haleakala	Pan-STARRS 1	PHO	900 m	MPC · JPL
549680	2011 QE_{106}	—	February 19, 2013	Kitt Peak	Spacewatch	H	390 m	MPC · JPL
549681	2011 QP_{106}	—	February 1, 2017	Mount Lemmon	Mount Lemmon Survey	(5)	860 m	MPC · JPL
549682	2011 QT_{106}	—	February 18, 2015	Haleakala	Pan-STARRS 1	·	3.2 km	MPC · JPL
549683	2011 QX_{106}	—	October 12, 2016	Mount Lemmon	Mount Lemmon Survey	·	2.0 km	MPC · JPL
549684	2011 QF_{108}	—	August 30, 2011	Haleakala	Pan-STARRS 1	·	1.0 km	MPC · JPL
549685	2011 RH	—	September 1, 2011	Kachina	Hobart, J.	·	2.9 km	MPC · JPL
549686	2011 RA_{1}	—	September 4, 2011	Haleakala	Pan-STARRS 1	·	1.6 km	MPC · JPL
549687	2011 RG_{1}	—	September 4, 2011	Haleakala	Pan-STARRS 1	·	720 m	MPC · JPL
549688	2011 RX_{7}	—	September 5, 2011	Haleakala	Pan-STARRS 1	·	1.6 km	MPC · JPL
549689	2011 RZ_{15}	—	December 14, 2006	Kitt Peak	Spacewatch	H	600 m	MPC · JPL
549690	2011 RA_{16}	—	September 4, 2011	Haleakala	Pan-STARRS 1	H	520 m	MPC · JPL
549691	2011 RH_{18}	—	August 6, 2007	Lulin	LUSS	NYS	1.3 km	MPC · JPL
549692	2011 RS_{18}	—	September 8, 2011	Kitt Peak	Spacewatch	AGN	910 m	MPC · JPL
549693	2011 RK_{21}	—	September 8, 2011	Kitt Peak	Spacewatch	·	1.1 km	MPC · JPL
549694	2011 RS_{21}	—	September 4, 2011	Haleakala	Pan-STARRS 1	·	1.8 km	MPC · JPL
549695	2011 RG_{22}	—	September 4, 2011	Haleakala	Pan-STARRS 1	V	600 m	MPC · JPL
549696	2011 RE_{23}	—	September 2, 2011	Haleakala	Pan-STARRS 1	·	920 m	MPC · JPL
549697	2011 RM_{23}	—	September 2, 2011	Haleakala	Pan-STARRS 1	·	1.4 km	MPC · JPL
549698	2011 RG_{27}	—	September 4, 2011	Haleakala	Pan-STARRS 1	PHO	770 m	MPC · JPL
549699	2011 RV_{27}	—	September 6, 2011	Haleakala	Pan-STARRS 1	·	710 m	MPC · JPL
549700	2011 RS_{29}	—	September 4, 2011	Haleakala	Pan-STARRS 1	·	930 m	MPC · JPL

== 549701–549800 ==
back to top

Designation			Discovery			Properties		Ref
Permanent	Provisional	Named after	Date	Site	Discoverer(s)	Category	Diam.	Ref
549701	2011 SM	—	September 2, 2011	Haleakala	Pan-STARRS 1	H	390 m	MPC · JPL
549702	2011 SC_{1}	—	October 5, 2002	Palomar	NEAT	AGN	980 m	MPC · JPL
549703	2011 SH_{3}	—	September 17, 2011	La Sagra	OAM	·	1.5 km	MPC · JPL
549704	2011 SW_{10}	—	September 19, 2011	Sandlot	G. Hug	(5)	1.0 km	MPC · JPL
549705	2011 SC_{24}	—	June 9, 2011	Mount Lemmon	Mount Lemmon Survey	PHO	850 m	MPC · JPL
549706 Spbuni	2011 SH_{24}	Spbuni	September 21, 2011	Zelenchukskaya Stn	T. V. Krjačko, Satovski, B.	(1547)	1.6 km	MPC · JPL
549707	2011 SY_{24}	—	February 19, 2009	Kitt Peak	Spacewatch	·	1.6 km	MPC · JPL
549708	2011 SH_{37}	—	September 20, 2011	Kitt Peak	Spacewatch	·	950 m	MPC · JPL
549709	2011 SR_{38}	—	February 19, 2009	Mount Lemmon	Mount Lemmon Survey	HOF	2.5 km	MPC · JPL
549710	2011 SM_{41}	—	January 18, 2009	Mount Lemmon	Mount Lemmon Survey	·	1.4 km	MPC · JPL
549711	2011 SE_{43}	—	September 18, 2011	Mount Lemmon	Mount Lemmon Survey	AGN	990 m	MPC · JPL
549712	2011 SG_{46}	—	October 20, 2007	Mount Lemmon	Mount Lemmon Survey	·	1.5 km	MPC · JPL
549713	2011 SL_{54}	—	October 16, 2007	Catalina	CSS	·	900 m	MPC · JPL
549714	2011 SX_{55}	—	March 26, 2006	Kitt Peak	Spacewatch	V	560 m	MPC · JPL
549715	2011 SK_{56}	—	September 23, 2011	Haleakala	Pan-STARRS 1	·	2.0 km	MPC · JPL
549716	2011 SE_{57}	—	September 23, 2011	Haleakala	Pan-STARRS 1	PHO	840 m	MPC · JPL
549717	2011 SR_{58}	—	September 18, 2011	Mount Lemmon	Mount Lemmon Survey	HOF	2.1 km	MPC · JPL
549718	2011 SZ_{58}	—	September 18, 2011	Mount Lemmon	Mount Lemmon Survey	HOF	1.8 km	MPC · JPL
549719	2011 SX_{62}	—	September 21, 2011	Haleakala	Pan-STARRS 1	·	1.5 km	MPC · JPL
549720	2011 SZ_{65}	—	June 11, 2011	Haleakala	Pan-STARRS 1	·	1.7 km	MPC · JPL
549721	2011 SA_{66}	—	September 20, 2011	La Sagra	OAM	BAR	1.1 km	MPC · JPL
549722	2011 SP_{66}	—	September 21, 2011	Catalina	CSS	·	1.4 km	MPC · JPL
549723	2011 SQ_{67}	—	September 23, 2011	Mount Lemmon	Mount Lemmon Survey	AGN	1.2 km	MPC · JPL
549724	2011 SA_{69}	—	September 23, 2011	Haleakala	Pan-STARRS 1	·	1.6 km	MPC · JPL
549725	2011 SA_{79}	—	February 16, 2010	Mount Lemmon	Mount Lemmon Survey	MAS	610 m	MPC · JPL
549726	2011 SJ_{80}	—	September 20, 2011	Mount Lemmon	Mount Lemmon Survey	·	2.0 km	MPC · JPL
549727	2011 SV_{83}	—	September 7, 2004	Goodricke-Pigott	R. A. Tucker	·	580 m	MPC · JPL
549728	2011 SG_{84}	—	September 21, 2011	Kitt Peak	Spacewatch	V	660 m	MPC · JPL
549729	2011 SU_{85}	—	September 21, 2011	Kitt Peak	Spacewatch	GEF	1.1 km	MPC · JPL
549730	2011 SN_{86}	—	September 22, 2011	Mount Lemmon	Mount Lemmon Survey	·	1.4 km	MPC · JPL
549731	2011 SD_{87}	—	September 22, 2011	Kitt Peak	Spacewatch	·	1.7 km	MPC · JPL
549732	2011 SM_{89}	—	December 31, 2008	Bergisch Gladbach	W. Bickel	·	1.3 km	MPC · JPL
549733	2011 SS_{95}	—	March 5, 2006	Kitt Peak	Spacewatch	PHO	960 m	MPC · JPL
549734	2011 SR_{97}	—	November 14, 2002	Palomar	NEAT	·	1.7 km	MPC · JPL
549735	2011 SJ_{100}	—	September 18, 2011	Mount Lemmon	Mount Lemmon Survey	·	1.2 km	MPC · JPL
549736	2011 SU_{101}	—	September 24, 2011	Mount Lemmon	Mount Lemmon Survey	THM	2.2 km	MPC · JPL
549737	2011 SY_{105}	—	November 18, 2003	Kitt Peak	Spacewatch	·	1.5 km	MPC · JPL
549738	2011 ST_{106}	—	September 4, 2011	Haleakala	Pan-STARRS 1	H	500 m	MPC · JPL
549739	2011 SQ_{109}	—	April 25, 2003	Anderson Mesa	LONEOS	·	1.2 km	MPC · JPL
549740	2011 SH_{112}	—	September 4, 2011	Haleakala	Pan-STARRS 1	GEF	1.2 km	MPC · JPL
549741	2011 SA_{113}	—	October 27, 2003	Kitt Peak	Spacewatch	MAR	1.4 km	MPC · JPL
549742	2011 SH_{116}	—	August 4, 2005	Palomar	NEAT	·	3.3 km	MPC · JPL
549743	2011 SQ_{118}	—	June 23, 2001	Palomar	NEAT	·	3.1 km	MPC · JPL
549744 Heimpál	2011 SL_{119}	Heimpál	September 25, 2011	Piszkéstető	K. Sárneczky, A. Farkas	·	1.9 km	MPC · JPL
549745	2011 SO_{123}	—	September 18, 2011	Mount Lemmon	Mount Lemmon Survey	·	810 m	MPC · JPL
549746	2011 SD_{128}	—	October 23, 2004	Kitt Peak	Spacewatch	·	930 m	MPC · JPL
549747	2011 SS_{129}	—	July 10, 2007	Lulin	LUSS	·	1.3 km	MPC · JPL
549748	2011 SE_{138}	—	October 14, 2007	Mount Lemmon	Mount Lemmon Survey	·	1.2 km	MPC · JPL
549749	2011 SY_{139}	—	September 20, 2011	Kitt Peak	Spacewatch	·	1.2 km	MPC · JPL
549750	2011 SG_{143}	—	September 21, 2011	Kitt Peak	Spacewatch	·	1.0 km	MPC · JPL
549751	2011 SR_{144}	—	September 26, 2011	Haleakala	Pan-STARRS 1	·	1.9 km	MPC · JPL
549752	2011 SQ_{146}	—	August 25, 2011	Dauban	C. Rinner, Kugel, F.	MAS	660 m	MPC · JPL
549753	2011 SY_{155}	—	September 26, 2011	Haleakala	Pan-STARRS 1	·	1.6 km	MPC · JPL
549754	2011 SY_{157}	—	August 27, 2011	Piszkéstető	K. Sárneczky	·	1.4 km	MPC · JPL
549755	2011 ST_{158}	—	September 22, 2011	Mount Lemmon	Mount Lemmon Survey	BAR	1.3 km	MPC · JPL
549756	2011 SX_{159}	—	September 23, 2011	Kitt Peak	Spacewatch	TIR	2.6 km	MPC · JPL
549757	2011 SB_{164}	—	September 21, 2011	Mount Lemmon	Mount Lemmon Survey	H	510 m	MPC · JPL
549758	2011 SC_{171}	—	August 28, 2003	Palomar	NEAT	·	1.3 km	MPC · JPL
549759	2011 SV_{173}	—	July 8, 2002	Palomar	NEAT	·	1.6 km	MPC · JPL
549760	2011 SO_{175}	—	September 26, 2011	Haleakala	Pan-STARRS 1	·	860 m	MPC · JPL
549761	2011 SA_{187}	—	November 4, 2007	Mount Lemmon	Mount Lemmon Survey	·	1.1 km	MPC · JPL
549762	2011 SL_{190}	—	September 29, 2011	Mount Lemmon	Mount Lemmon Survey	·	1.7 km	MPC · JPL
549763	2011 SG_{192}	—	October 15, 2002	Palomar	NEAT	·	2.3 km	MPC · JPL
549764	2011 SG_{194}	—	July 21, 2006	Mount Lemmon	Mount Lemmon Survey	MRX	1.1 km	MPC · JPL
549765	2011 SK_{196}	—	October 8, 2004	Kitt Peak	Spacewatch	·	660 m	MPC · JPL
549766	2011 SJ_{197}	—	September 2, 2011	Haleakala	Pan-STARRS 1	·	1.3 km	MPC · JPL
549767	2011 SW_{198}	—	September 18, 2011	Mount Lemmon	Mount Lemmon Survey	H	490 m	MPC · JPL
549768	2011 SM_{200}	—	September 5, 2000	Kitt Peak	Spacewatch	·	1.1 km	MPC · JPL
549769	2011 SZ_{203}	—	September 20, 2011	Kitt Peak	Spacewatch	V	600 m	MPC · JPL
549770	2011 SP_{205}	—	September 20, 2011	Kitt Peak	Spacewatch	NYS	840 m	MPC · JPL
549771	2011 SH_{206}	—	August 31, 2011	Haleakala	Pan-STARRS 1	CLA	1.6 km	MPC · JPL
549772	2011 SU_{207}	—	March 13, 2010	Mount Lemmon	Mount Lemmon Survey	·	1.3 km	MPC · JPL
549773	2011 SK_{208}	—	June 6, 2010	Tenerife	ESA OGS	·	3.1 km	MPC · JPL
549774	2011 SS_{218}	—	September 25, 2011	Haleakala	Pan-STARRS 1	·	1.5 km	MPC · JPL
549775	2011 SL_{219}	—	January 16, 2009	Kitt Peak	Spacewatch	·	1.1 km	MPC · JPL
549776	2011 SC_{222}	—	September 27, 2011	La Sagra	OAM	·	1.2 km	MPC · JPL
549777	2011 SH_{222}	—	September 24, 2011	Bergisch Gladbach	W. Bickel	·	1.5 km	MPC · JPL
549778	2011 SA_{224}	—	March 18, 2010	Mount Lemmon	Mount Lemmon Survey	·	1.1 km	MPC · JPL
549779	2011 SC_{224}	—	August 26, 2005	Palomar	NEAT	·	3.2 km	MPC · JPL
549780	2011 SS_{225}	—	September 29, 2011	Mount Lemmon	Mount Lemmon Survey	·	840 m	MPC · JPL
549781	2011 SO_{228}	—	October 24, 2003	Kitt Peak	Spacewatch	·	1.0 km	MPC · JPL
549782	2011 SW_{237}	—	September 26, 2011	Mount Lemmon	Mount Lemmon Survey	·	1.1 km	MPC · JPL
549783	2011 SR_{240}	—	September 26, 2011	Mount Lemmon	Mount Lemmon Survey	NYS	810 m	MPC · JPL
549784	2011 ST_{242}	—	February 15, 2010	Kitt Peak	Spacewatch	MAS	730 m	MPC · JPL
549785	2011 SW_{245}	—	September 29, 2011	Mount Lemmon	Mount Lemmon Survey	·	3.1 km	MPC · JPL
549786	2011 SX_{248}	—	September 8, 2011	Kitt Peak	Spacewatch	·	1.5 km	MPC · JPL
549787	2011 SW_{249}	—	September 20, 2007	Catalina	CSS	MAR	920 m	MPC · JPL
549788	2011 SS_{250}	—	September 24, 2011	Haleakala	Pan-STARRS 1	H	440 m	MPC · JPL
549789	2011 SW_{258}	—	September 3, 2007	Catalina	CSS	·	1.0 km	MPC · JPL
549790	2011 SH_{259}	—	September 26, 2011	Catalina	CSS	CLO	2.1 km	MPC · JPL
549791	2011 SS_{264}	—	August 30, 2011	Haleakala	Pan-STARRS 1	·	1.0 km	MPC · JPL
549792	2011 SZ_{265}	—	November 1, 2008	Mount Lemmon	Mount Lemmon Survey	V	560 m	MPC · JPL
549793	2011 SU_{266}	—	November 5, 2007	Kitt Peak	Spacewatch	·	1.6 km	MPC · JPL
549794	2011 SF_{279}	—	September 11, 2007	XuYi	PMO NEO Survey Program	·	1.1 km	MPC · JPL
549795	2011 SQ_{281}	—	September 24, 2011	Haleakala	Pan-STARRS 1	MAR	780 m	MPC · JPL
549796	2011 SP_{282}	—	September 19, 2011	Haleakala	Pan-STARRS 1	·	1.3 km	MPC · JPL
549797	2011 SH_{284}	—	September 23, 2011	Kitt Peak	Spacewatch	PHO	670 m	MPC · JPL
549798	2011 SH_{285}	—	February 16, 2015	Haleakala	Pan-STARRS 1	·	3.3 km	MPC · JPL
549799	2011 SQ_{285}	—	April 8, 2014	Kitt Peak	Spacewatch	·	1.2 km	MPC · JPL
549800	2011 SZ_{285}	—	September 21, 2011	Mount Lemmon	Mount Lemmon Survey	·	2.9 km	MPC · JPL

== 549801–549900 ==
back to top

Designation			Discovery			Properties		Ref
Permanent	Provisional	Named after	Date	Site	Discoverer(s)	Category	Diam.	Ref
549801	2011 SV_{286}	—	January 10, 2013	Haleakala	Pan-STARRS 1	·	950 m	MPC · JPL
549802	2011 SU_{296}	—	September 29, 2011	Mount Lemmon	Mount Lemmon Survey	·	3.5 km	MPC · JPL
549803	2011 SW_{301}	—	January 26, 2017	Haleakala	Pan-STARRS 1	MAR	770 m	MPC · JPL
549804	2011 SK_{302}	—	September 20, 2011	Haleakala	Pan-STARRS 1	·	1.1 km	MPC · JPL
549805	2011 SW_{302}	—	October 7, 2016	Mount Lemmon	Mount Lemmon Survey	PAD	1.3 km	MPC · JPL
549806	2011 SH_{303}	—	January 15, 2018	Haleakala	Pan-STARRS 1	·	1.4 km	MPC · JPL
549807	2011 SP_{304}	—	September 19, 2011	Haleakala	Pan-STARRS 1	·	1.6 km	MPC · JPL
549808	2011 SV_{304}	—	February 7, 2013	Kitt Peak	Spacewatch	·	890 m	MPC · JPL
549809	2011 SY_{305}	—	September 21, 2011	Haleakala	Pan-STARRS 1	·	930 m	MPC · JPL
549810	2011 SL_{310}	—	September 23, 2011	Haleakala	Pan-STARRS 1	·	1.3 km	MPC · JPL
549811	2011 SJ_{314}	—	September 26, 2011	Haleakala	Pan-STARRS 1	·	1.4 km	MPC · JPL
549812	2011 SM_{317}	—	September 29, 2011	Mount Lemmon	Mount Lemmon Survey	·	1.5 km	MPC · JPL
549813	2011 SB_{318}	—	September 23, 2011	Haleakala	Pan-STARRS 1	·	990 m	MPC · JPL
549814	2011 SE_{320}	—	September 21, 2011	Haleakala	Pan-STARRS 1	·	1.4 km	MPC · JPL
549815	2011 TN_{1}	—	September 23, 2011	Haleakala	Pan-STARRS 1	·	2.2 km	MPC · JPL
549816	2011 TD_{7}	—	August 22, 2007	Kitt Peak	Spacewatch	·	1.3 km	MPC · JPL
549817	2011 TG_{11}	—	August 10, 2007	Kitt Peak	Spacewatch	CLA	1.3 km	MPC · JPL
549818	2011 TC_{15}	—	September 4, 2011	Haleakala	Pan-STARRS 1	HOF	2.4 km	MPC · JPL
549819	2011 TK_{15}	—	October 3, 2011	Mount Lemmon	Mount Lemmon Survey	·	1.8 km	MPC · JPL
549820	2011 TZ_{15}	—	October 1, 2011	Kitt Peak	Spacewatch	·	1.1 km	MPC · JPL
549821	2011 TR_{16}	—	October 3, 2011	Siding Spring	SSS	·	1.9 km	MPC · JPL
549822	2011 TS_{16}	—	January 1, 2009	Kitt Peak	Spacewatch	·	1.2 km	MPC · JPL
549823	2011 UK_{4}	—	March 18, 2010	Kitt Peak	Spacewatch	·	830 m	MPC · JPL
549824	2011 UF_{11}	—	September 18, 2011	Mount Lemmon	Mount Lemmon Survey	·	1.4 km	MPC · JPL
549825	2011 UR_{11}	—	February 20, 2009	Mount Lemmon	Mount Lemmon Survey	PAD	1.5 km	MPC · JPL
549826	2011 UA_{15}	—	October 17, 2011	Kitt Peak	Spacewatch	TIN	1.1 km	MPC · JPL
549827	2011 UN_{19}	—	October 19, 2011	Mount Lemmon	Mount Lemmon Survey	·	1.2 km	MPC · JPL
549828	2011 UX_{28}	—	January 27, 2004	Catalina	CSS	·	1.5 km	MPC · JPL
549829	2011 UO_{32}	—	August 22, 2006	Palomar	NEAT	GEF	1.3 km	MPC · JPL
549830	2011 UB_{40}	—	September 17, 2006	Kitt Peak	Spacewatch	·	1.6 km	MPC · JPL
549831	2011 US_{41}	—	December 29, 2008	Kitt Peak	Spacewatch	MAS	720 m	MPC · JPL
549832	2011 UZ_{46}	—	July 23, 2003	Palomar	NEAT	·	1.3 km	MPC · JPL
549833	2011 UW_{48}	—	May 4, 2005	Mauna Kea	Veillet, C.	KON	1.6 km	MPC · JPL
549834	2011 UK_{52}	—	October 18, 2011	Kitt Peak	Spacewatch	·	790 m	MPC · JPL
549835	2011 UM_{54}	—	October 18, 2011	Mount Lemmon	Mount Lemmon Survey	·	1.1 km	MPC · JPL
549836	2011 UZ_{57}	—	February 14, 2009	Catalina	CSS	·	1.4 km	MPC · JPL
549837	2011 UT_{64}	—	October 19, 2011	Kitt Peak	Spacewatch	·	1.1 km	MPC · JPL
549838	2011 UP_{69}	—	December 30, 2007	Mount Lemmon	Mount Lemmon Survey	·	1.5 km	MPC · JPL
549839	2011 UD_{70}	—	January 16, 2004	Kitt Peak	Spacewatch	·	1.2 km	MPC · JPL
549840	2011 UZ_{76}	—	October 19, 2011	Kitt Peak	Spacewatch	·	1.5 km	MPC · JPL
549841	2011 UK_{79}	—	November 5, 2007	Kitt Peak	Spacewatch	·	980 m	MPC · JPL
549842	2011 UD_{84}	—	November 5, 2007	Kitt Peak	Spacewatch	·	1.0 km	MPC · JPL
549843	2011 UG_{84}	—	October 19, 2011	Kitt Peak	Spacewatch	·	1.1 km	MPC · JPL
549844	2011 UC_{85}	—	September 11, 2007	Kitt Peak	Spacewatch	·	1.2 km	MPC · JPL
549845	2011 UV_{85}	—	October 20, 2011	Mount Lemmon	Mount Lemmon Survey	·	1.5 km	MPC · JPL
549846	2011 UD_{86}	—	September 17, 2006	Kitt Peak	Spacewatch	·	1.4 km	MPC · JPL
549847	2011 UO_{98}	—	October 20, 2011	Kitt Peak	Spacewatch	·	1.2 km	MPC · JPL
549848	2011 UV_{100}	—	September 11, 2007	Kitt Peak	Spacewatch	MAS	820 m	MPC · JPL
549849	2011 US_{106}	—	August 3, 2008	Siding Spring	SSS	H	480 m	MPC · JPL
549850	2011 UE_{108}	—	August 22, 2006	Palomar	NEAT	·	2.0 km	MPC · JPL
549851	2011 UZ_{111}	—	September 23, 2011	Kitt Peak	Spacewatch	PHO	720 m	MPC · JPL
549852	2011 UF_{133}	—	October 23, 2011	Kitt Peak	Spacewatch	·	1.1 km	MPC · JPL
549853	2011 UZ_{137}	—	November 30, 2003	Kitt Peak	Spacewatch	·	960 m	MPC · JPL
549854	2011 UZ_{141}	—	October 23, 2011	Mount Lemmon	Mount Lemmon Survey	·	1.0 km	MPC · JPL
549855	2011 UN_{145}	—	October 20, 2011	Kitt Peak	Spacewatch	·	1.4 km	MPC · JPL
549856	2011 UV_{151}	—	October 24, 2011	Haleakala	Pan-STARRS 1	H	610 m	MPC · JPL
549857	2011 UQ_{152}	—	October 21, 2011	Mount Lemmon	Mount Lemmon Survey	·	1.1 km	MPC · JPL
549858	2011 UN_{156}	—	October 24, 2011	Mount Lemmon	Mount Lemmon Survey	·	1.3 km	MPC · JPL
549859	2011 UZ_{160}	—	May 16, 2005	Kitt Peak	Spacewatch	·	1.1 km	MPC · JPL
549860	2011 UK_{166}	—	October 26, 2011	Haleakala	Pan-STARRS 1	·	960 m	MPC · JPL
549861	2011 UD_{167}	—	August 17, 2006	Palomar	NEAT	·	2.0 km	MPC · JPL
549862	2011 UH_{168}	—	September 4, 2011	Haleakala	Pan-STARRS 1	·	820 m	MPC · JPL
549863	2011 UQ_{169}	—	June 22, 2007	Siding Spring	SSS	·	980 m	MPC · JPL
549864	2011 UB_{170}	—	September 23, 2011	Kitt Peak	Spacewatch	·	980 m	MPC · JPL
549865	2011 UY_{170}	—	September 21, 2003	Kitt Peak	Spacewatch	·	890 m	MPC · JPL
549866	2011 UA_{174}	—	September 27, 2011	Mount Lemmon	Mount Lemmon Survey	·	940 m	MPC · JPL
549867	2011 UA_{175}	—	September 20, 2003	Kitt Peak	Spacewatch	·	1.4 km	MPC · JPL
549868	2011 UC_{184}	—	March 9, 2000	Kitt Peak	Spacewatch	(5)	990 m	MPC · JPL
549869	2011 UR_{185}	—	October 25, 2011	Haleakala	Pan-STARRS 1	·	900 m	MPC · JPL
549870	2011 UD_{193}	—	October 1, 2011	Piszkéstető	K. Sárneczky	·	1.2 km	MPC · JPL
549871	2011 UX_{193}	—	October 20, 2011	Catalina	CSS	(1547)	1.2 km	MPC · JPL
549872	2011 UJ_{195}	—	October 5, 2011	Piszkéstető	K. Sárneczky	·	1.8 km	MPC · JPL
549873 Portsevskii	2011 UA_{205}	Portsevskii	October 26, 2011	Zelenchukskaya Stn	T. V. Krjačko, Satovski, B.	EUN	1.3 km	MPC · JPL
549874	2011 UY_{205}	—	May 6, 2006	Mount Lemmon	Mount Lemmon Survey	NYS	910 m	MPC · JPL
549875	2011 UF_{206}	—	October 29, 2011	Haleakala	Pan-STARRS 1	DOR	2.4 km	MPC · JPL
549876	2011 UQ_{224}	—	October 24, 2011	Mount Lemmon	Mount Lemmon Survey	KOR	1.0 km	MPC · JPL
549877	2011 UT_{225}	—	October 20, 2011	Haleakala	Haleakala	·	1.9 km	MPC · JPL
549878	2011 US_{229}	—	January 17, 2013	Haleakala	Pan-STARRS 1	KOR	1 km	MPC · JPL
549879	2011 UQ_{234}	—	October 23, 2011	Kitt Peak	Spacewatch	·	1.5 km	MPC · JPL
549880	2011 UR_{241}	—	October 18, 2011	Kitt Peak	Spacewatch	·	1.8 km	MPC · JPL
549881	2011 UR_{257}	—	September 21, 2001	Kitt Peak	Spacewatch	KOR	1.4 km	MPC · JPL
549882	2011 UQ_{262}	—	October 19, 2006	Kitt Peak	Spacewatch	·	1.4 km	MPC · JPL
549883	2011 US_{267}	—	January 18, 2004	Palomar	NEAT	·	1.6 km	MPC · JPL
549884	2011 UC_{272}	—	August 30, 2011	Haleakala	Pan-STARRS 1	·	1.6 km	MPC · JPL
549885	2011 UJ_{276}	—	October 24, 2011	Kitt Peak	Spacewatch	·	2.0 km	MPC · JPL
549886	2011 UU_{276}	—	October 20, 2011	Kitt Peak	Spacewatch	·	1.6 km	MPC · JPL
549887	2011 UE_{291}	—	September 24, 2011	Haleakala	Pan-STARRS 1	PHO	740 m	MPC · JPL
549888	2011 UT_{293}	—	November 4, 2007	Kitt Peak	Spacewatch	·	1.1 km	MPC · JPL
549889	2011 UN_{300}	—	December 18, 2007	Kitt Peak	Spacewatch	·	1.2 km	MPC · JPL
549890	2011 UQ_{315}	—	October 30, 2011	Kitt Peak	Spacewatch	·	1.1 km	MPC · JPL
549891	2011 UV_{317}	—	April 8, 2002	Palomar	NEAT	·	1.3 km	MPC · JPL
549892	2011 UN_{320}	—	October 30, 2011	XuYi	PMO NEO Survey Program	·	1.8 km	MPC · JPL
549893	2011 UH_{322}	—	August 20, 2002	Palomar	NEAT	·	2.1 km	MPC · JPL
549894	2011 UM_{330}	—	January 17, 2004	Palomar	NEAT	ADE	1.8 km	MPC · JPL
549895	2011 UW_{332}	—	September 9, 2002	Palomar	NEAT	·	1.9 km	MPC · JPL
549896	2011 UA_{337}	—	February 4, 2009	Kitt Peak	Spacewatch	·	1.3 km	MPC · JPL
549897	2011 US_{342}	—	December 5, 2007	Kitt Peak	Spacewatch	·	1.8 km	MPC · JPL
549898	2011 UC_{349}	—	September 15, 2006	Kitt Peak	Spacewatch	KOR	1.1 km	MPC · JPL
549899	2011 UC_{350}	—	September 8, 2007	Mount Lemmon	Mount Lemmon Survey	·	750 m	MPC · JPL
549900	2011 UE_{354}	—	October 20, 2011	Mount Lemmon	Mount Lemmon Survey	·	1.5 km	MPC · JPL

== 549901–550000 ==
back to top

Designation			Discovery			Properties		Ref
Permanent	Provisional	Named after	Date	Site	Discoverer(s)	Category	Diam.	Ref
549901	2011 UG_{361}	—	February 26, 2009	Kitt Peak	Spacewatch	·	850 m	MPC · JPL
549902	2011 UK_{362}	—	October 21, 2011	Mount Lemmon	Mount Lemmon Survey	·	1.4 km	MPC · JPL
549903	2011 UH_{367}	—	December 30, 2007	Kitt Peak	Spacewatch	KOR	1.0 km	MPC · JPL
549904	2011 UW_{368}	—	November 11, 2007	Mount Lemmon	Mount Lemmon Survey	·	910 m	MPC · JPL
549905	2011 UX_{371}	—	October 23, 2011	Mount Lemmon	Mount Lemmon Survey	EUN	840 m	MPC · JPL
549906	2011 UW_{375}	—	December 4, 2007	Kitt Peak	Spacewatch	RAF	720 m	MPC · JPL
549907	2011 UL_{391}	—	October 26, 2011	Haleakala	Pan-STARRS 1	·	1.4 km	MPC · JPL
549908	2011 UU_{394}	—	January 28, 2004	Socorro	LINEAR	JUN	1.2 km	MPC · JPL
549909	2011 UV_{395}	—	September 24, 2011	Haleakala	Pan-STARRS 1	·	870 m	MPC · JPL
549910	2011 UK_{396}	—	December 25, 2003	Haleakala	NEAT	·	1.5 km	MPC · JPL
549911	2011 UC_{402}	—	October 18, 2007	Mount Lemmon	Mount Lemmon Survey	·	1.1 km	MPC · JPL
549912	2011 UZ_{402}	—	February 8, 2008	Kitt Peak	Spacewatch	·	1.4 km	MPC · JPL
549913	2011 UV_{406}	—	August 13, 2002	Palomar	NEAT	·	1.7 km	MPC · JPL
549914	2011 UM_{408}	—	October 24, 2011	Mount Lemmon	Mount Lemmon Survey	·	1.4 km	MPC · JPL
549915	2011 UW_{413}	—	October 5, 2007	Kitt Peak	Spacewatch	·	1.2 km	MPC · JPL
549916	2011 UF_{417}	—	October 25, 2011	Haleakala	Pan-STARRS 1	·	1.3 km	MPC · JPL
549917	2011 UK_{420}	—	October 25, 2011	Haleakala	Pan-STARRS 1	·	1.2 km	MPC · JPL
549918	2011 UN_{420}	—	October 20, 2011	Mount Lemmon	Mount Lemmon Survey	·	3.3 km	MPC · JPL
549919	2011 UU_{422}	—	October 24, 2011	Haleakala	Pan-STARRS 1	·	1.4 km	MPC · JPL
549920	2011 UR_{423}	—	February 3, 2013	Haleakala	Pan-STARRS 1	·	1.5 km	MPC · JPL
549921	2011 UR_{424}	—	October 24, 2011	Kitt Peak	Spacewatch	·	1.0 km	MPC · JPL
549922	2011 UB_{426}	—	April 16, 2013	Haleakala	Pan-STARRS 1	(5)	1.1 km	MPC · JPL
549923	2011 UG_{426}	—	November 6, 2015	Haleakala	Pan-STARRS 1	·	910 m	MPC · JPL
549924	2011 UT_{426}	—	September 8, 2015	Haleakala	Pan-STARRS 1	·	1.8 km	MPC · JPL
549925	2011 US_{427}	—	October 23, 2011	Haleakala	Pan-STARRS 1	·	1.4 km	MPC · JPL
549926	2011 UL_{434}	—	October 1, 2011	Kitt Peak	Spacewatch	·	970 m	MPC · JPL
549927	2011 UY_{436}	—	January 29, 2017	Haleakala	Pan-STARRS 1	EUN	810 m	MPC · JPL
549928	2011 UN_{442}	—	October 24, 2011	Kitt Peak	Spacewatch	·	1.8 km	MPC · JPL
549929	2011 UY_{444}	—	June 17, 2018	Haleakala	Pan-STARRS 1	·	800 m	MPC · JPL
549930	2011 UF_{445}	—	February 13, 2013	Haleakala	Pan-STARRS 1	·	710 m	MPC · JPL
549931	2011 UA_{447}	—	October 25, 2011	Haleakala	Pan-STARRS 1	RAF	760 m	MPC · JPL
549932	2011 UY_{448}	—	March 13, 2013	Haleakala	Pan-STARRS 1	·	710 m	MPC · JPL
549933	2011 UH_{458}	—	October 26, 2011	Haleakala	Pan-STARRS 1	·	1.2 km	MPC · JPL
549934	2011 UP_{460}	—	February 2, 2008	Mount Lemmon	Mount Lemmon Survey	KOR	1.0 km	MPC · JPL
549935	2011 UW_{464}	—	October 21, 2011	Mount Lemmon	Mount Lemmon Survey	AEO	670 m	MPC · JPL
549936	2011 UB_{465}	—	October 28, 2011	Mount Lemmon	Mount Lemmon Survey	·	1.2 km	MPC · JPL
549937	2011 UT_{465}	—	October 25, 2011	Haleakala	Pan-STARRS 1	·	1.6 km	MPC · JPL
549938	2011 UY_{466}	—	October 26, 2011	Haleakala	Pan-STARRS 1	·	1.3 km	MPC · JPL
549939	2011 US_{467}	—	October 24, 2011	Haleakala	Pan-STARRS 1	·	960 m	MPC · JPL
549940	2011 VB_{6}	—	March 19, 2010	Mount Lemmon	Mount Lemmon Survey	·	1.2 km	MPC · JPL
549941	2011 VL_{7}	—	November 1, 2011	Mount Lemmon	Mount Lemmon Survey	·	1.3 km	MPC · JPL
549942	2011 VM_{11}	—	September 26, 2006	Mount Lemmon	Mount Lemmon Survey	KOR	1.1 km	MPC · JPL
549943	2011 VO_{16}	—	October 19, 2007	Mount Lemmon	Mount Lemmon Survey	·	970 m	MPC · JPL
549944	2011 VR_{24}	—	November 3, 2011	Mount Lemmon	Mount Lemmon Survey	·	1.2 km	MPC · JPL
549945	2011 VY_{24}	—	November 8, 2007	Mount Lemmon	Mount Lemmon Survey	EUN	800 m	MPC · JPL
549946	2011 VP_{25}	—	October 3, 2005	Palomar	NEAT	·	3.2 km	MPC · JPL
549947	2011 VL_{32}	—	November 2, 2011	Mount Lemmon	Mount Lemmon Survey	·	1.8 km	MPC · JPL
549948	2011 WL_{2}	—	November 16, 2011	Socorro	LINEAR	APO · PHA	240 m	MPC · JPL
549949	2011 WX_{7}	—	November 16, 2011	Mount Lemmon	Mount Lemmon Survey	KON	1.7 km	MPC · JPL
549950	2011 WB_{10}	—	November 16, 2011	Mount Lemmon	Mount Lemmon Survey	KOR	1.3 km	MPC · JPL
549951	2011 WV_{10}	—	October 24, 2011	Haleakala	Pan-STARRS 1	·	900 m	MPC · JPL
549952	2011 WF_{11}	—	October 26, 2011	Haleakala	Pan-STARRS 1	·	890 m	MPC · JPL
549953	2011 WR_{14}	—	January 17, 2004	Palomar	NEAT	EUN	1.4 km	MPC · JPL
549954	2011 WS_{14}	—	September 24, 2011	Haleakala	Pan-STARRS 1	PHO	750 m	MPC · JPL
549955	2011 WZ_{19}	—	November 17, 2011	Mount Lemmon	Mount Lemmon Survey	(5)	980 m	MPC · JPL
549956	2011 WD_{25}	—	November 2, 2011	Kitt Peak	Spacewatch	·	1.1 km	MPC · JPL
549957	2011 WC_{26}	—	November 18, 2011	Mount Lemmon	Mount Lemmon Survey	·	1.0 km	MPC · JPL
549958	2011 WV_{27}	—	October 25, 2011	Haleakala	Pan-STARRS 1	·	1.1 km	MPC · JPL
549959	2011 WG_{28}	—	October 24, 2011	Haleakala	Pan-STARRS 1	·	1.8 km	MPC · JPL
549960	2011 WK_{28}	—	February 12, 2004	Kitt Peak	Spacewatch	·	1.0 km	MPC · JPL
549961 Földesistván	2011 WQ_{31}	Földesistván	November 23, 2011	Piszkéstető	K. Sárneczky, A. Pál	EUN	1.2 km	MPC · JPL
549962	2011 WR_{32}	—	October 2, 2006	Mount Lemmon	Mount Lemmon Survey	KOR	1.4 km	MPC · JPL
549963	2011 WY_{32}	—	November 8, 2011	Haleakala	Pan-STARRS 1	·	1.0 km	MPC · JPL
549964	2011 WG_{36}	—	October 25, 2011	Haleakala	Pan-STARRS 1	H	390 m	MPC · JPL
549965	2011 WB_{37}	—	October 18, 2011	Kitt Peak	Spacewatch	·	1.6 km	MPC · JPL
549966	2011 WG_{38}	—	January 30, 2004	Kitt Peak	Spacewatch	·	870 m	MPC · JPL
549967	2011 WH_{39}	—	November 24, 2011	Catalina	CSS	·	1.2 km	MPC · JPL
549968	2011 WJ_{39}	—	October 23, 2011	Haleakala	Pan-STARRS 1	·	1.2 km	MPC · JPL
549969	2011 WC_{41}	—	November 24, 2011	Haleakala	Pan-STARRS 1	·	840 m	MPC · JPL
549970	2011 WP_{42}	—	November 23, 2011	Catalina	CSS	·	1.3 km	MPC · JPL
549971	2011 WK_{50}	—	October 22, 2003	Apache Point	SDSS	MAS	740 m	MPC · JPL
549972	2011 WD_{51}	—	January 13, 2008	Kitt Peak	Spacewatch	·	1.2 km	MPC · JPL
549973	2011 WU_{51}	—	January 6, 2006	Mount Lemmon	Mount Lemmon Survey	·	600 m	MPC · JPL
549974	2011 WT_{53}	—	November 24, 2011	Kitt Peak	Spacewatch	·	1.4 km	MPC · JPL
549975	2011 WU_{55}	—	October 13, 1998	Kitt Peak	Spacewatch	·	1.1 km	MPC · JPL
549976	2011 WL_{56}	—	November 24, 2011	Haleakala	Pan-STARRS 1	·	1.0 km	MPC · JPL
549977	2011 WL_{64}	—	November 18, 2011	Mount Lemmon	Mount Lemmon Survey	·	1.2 km	MPC · JPL
549978	2011 WY_{67}	—	November 17, 2011	Kitt Peak	Spacewatch	·	1.2 km	MPC · JPL
549979	2011 WA_{71}	—	November 24, 2011	Kitt Peak	Spacewatch	(5)	1.4 km	MPC · JPL
549980	2011 WY_{73}	—	November 2, 2011	Mount Lemmon	Mount Lemmon Survey	·	1.6 km	MPC · JPL
549981	2011 WC_{76}	—	June 14, 2010	Nogales	M. Schwartz, P. R. Holvorcem	·	2.3 km	MPC · JPL
549982	2011 WL_{76}	—	November 23, 2011	Mount Lemmon	Mount Lemmon Survey	·	900 m	MPC · JPL
549983	2011 WF_{80}	—	October 26, 2011	Haleakala	Pan-STARRS 1	·	1.1 km	MPC · JPL
549984	2011 WE_{85}	—	August 25, 2003	Palomar	NEAT	·	1.4 km	MPC · JPL
549985	2011 WC_{99}	—	October 18, 2011	Haleakala	Pan-STARRS 1	·	970 m	MPC · JPL
549986	2011 WK_{102}	—	November 27, 2011	Mount Lemmon	Mount Lemmon Survey	·	820 m	MPC · JPL
549987	2011 WS_{111}	—	November 24, 2011	Haleakala	Pan-STARRS 1	·	1.4 km	MPC · JPL
549988	2011 WC_{113}	—	January 18, 2008	Kitt Peak	Spacewatch	·	1.4 km	MPC · JPL
549989	2011 WO_{114}	—	October 23, 2011	Haleakala	Pan-STARRS 1	·	2.0 km	MPC · JPL
549990	2011 WV_{120}	—	November 24, 2011	Sternwarte Hagen	Klein, M.	·	1.3 km	MPC · JPL
549991	2011 WC_{122}	—	September 18, 2007	Bergisch Gladbach	W. Bickel	·	1.0 km	MPC · JPL
549992	2011 WW_{124}	—	December 3, 2007	Kitt Peak	Spacewatch	·	1.6 km	MPC · JPL
549993	2011 WN_{128}	—	October 23, 2011	Kitt Peak	Spacewatch	·	920 m	MPC · JPL
549994	2011 WW_{130}	—	March 18, 2004	Apache Point	SDSS Collaboration	(5)	1.4 km	MPC · JPL
549995	2011 WW_{131}	—	April 21, 2009	Mount Lemmon	Mount Lemmon Survey	KON	2.3 km	MPC · JPL
549996 Dmitriiguliutin	2011 WX_{132}	Dmitriiguliutin	October 31, 2011	Zelenchukskaya Stn	T. V. Krjačko, Satovski, B.	H	430 m	MPC · JPL
549997	2011 WB_{133}	—	November 18, 2011	Mount Lemmon	Mount Lemmon Survey	EUN	920 m	MPC · JPL
549998	2011 WW_{135}	—	November 25, 2011	Haleakala	Pan-STARRS 1	L4	9.0 km	MPC · JPL
549999	2011 WO_{136}	—	November 30, 2011	Kitt Peak	Spacewatch	·	1.1 km	MPC · JPL
550000	2011 WQ_{137}	—	December 5, 2007	Kitt Peak	Spacewatch	(5)	1.5 km	MPC · JPL

back to top

== Meaning of names ==
As minor planet discoveries are confirmed, they are given a permanent number by the IAU's Minor Planet Center (MPC), and the discoverers can then submit names for them, following the IAU's naming conventions. The list below concerns those minor planets in the specified number-range that have received names, and explains the meanings of those names.

Official naming citations of newly named small Solar System bodies are approved and published in a bulletin by IAU's Working Group for Small Bodies Nomenclature (WGSBN). Before May 2021, citations were published in MPC's Minor Planet Circulars for many decades. Recent citations can also be found on the JPL Small-Body Database (SBDB). Until his death in 2016, German astronomer Lutz D. Schmadel compiled these citations into the Dictionary of Minor Planet Names (DMP) and regularly updated the collection.

Based on Paul Herget's The Names of the Minor Planets, Schmadel also researched the unclear origin of numerous asteroids, most of which had been named prior to World War II. This article incorporates text from this source, which is in the public domain: SBDB New namings may only be added to this list below after official publication as the preannouncement of names is condemned. The WGSBN publishes a comprehensive guideline for the naming rules of non-cometary small Solar System bodies.

Named minor planet	Provisional	This minor planet was named for...	Ref · Catalog
549107 Hackitamás	2011 CG_{45}	Tamás Hacki (b. 1944), a Hungarian ear, nose and throat specialist, university professor, and whistling artist.	IAU · 549107
549151 Serra-Ricart	2011 DG_{24}	Miquel Serra-Ricart (born 1966), Catalan astrophysicist at the Instituto de Astrofísica de Canarias in Spain.	IAU · 549151
549185 Herczeg	2011 EG_{44}	Tibor Herczeg (1926–2014) was a Hungarian astronomer and a mathematics and physics teacher. From 1949 to 1956 he was an assistant astronomer at the Konkoly Observatory. The main areas of his research were stellar evolution and the observation of variable stars.	IAU · 549185
549228 Labuda	2011 FW_{4}	Marián Labuda (1944–2018) was a Slovak actor, one of the most prominent of his generation. He had a long series of great theatre roles and regularly starred in both Slovak and Czech films. His most memorable performance was in the 1985 Czechoslovak cult comedy, Vesničko má středisková (My Sweet Little Village).	IAU · 549228
549229 Bánjános	2011 FB_{5}	János Bán (b. 1955) is a Hungarian actor. He was a founding member of the famous Katona József Theater, Budapest, and is one of the most popular foreign actors in Czech and Slovak films. His most memorable performance was in the 1985 Czechoslovak cult comedy, Vesničko má středisková (My Sweet Little Village).	IAU · 549229
549418 Andreifesenko	2011 HF_{61}	Description available (see ref). Please summarize in your own words.	IAU · 549418
549648 Shirokov	2011 QA_{39}	Stanislav Vasilevich Shirokov (1932–2010) was a Soviet astronomer, playwright and lecturer at the Moscow Planetarium and the Argo astronomical school. He created a number of theatrical astronomical programs, which are recognized as masterpieces in the field of popularization of astronomy.	IAU · 549648
549663 Barczaszabolcs	2011 QR_{66}	Szabolcs Barcza (1944–2021) was a Hungarian astronomer and honorary professor at the Eötvös Loránd University (ELTE). His research included atmospheric radiative transfers, both in stars and on Earth.	IAU · 549663
549650 Bilibin	2011 QR_{45}	Yuri A. Bilibin, prominent Soviet geologist and academician.	IAU · 549650
549676 Thanjavur	2011 QB_{105}	Karun G. Thanjavur (born 1957), Canadian astronomer and engineer at the Department of Physics and Astronomy of the University of Victoria.	IAU · 549676
549706 Spbuni	2011 SH_{24}	The names is dedicated to Saint Petersburg University, founded by Peter the Great in 1724, that was the first university in Russia	IAU · 549706
549744 Heimpál	2011 SL_{119}	Pál Heim (1875–1929), a Hungarian pediatrician and university professor who specialized in treating babies and children. The Pál Heim Children's Hospital in Budapest was named in his honor.	IAU · 549744
549873 Portsevskii	2011 UA_{205}	Konstantin Alekseevich Portsevskii (1922–2010) was a Soviet astronomer, researcher and science communicator. As director of the Moscow Planetarium, he created popular science lectures and taught astronomy classes, including classes at Argo astronomy school. He also created and hosted the educational TV show Astronomy.	IAU · 549873
549961 Földesistván	2011 WQ_{31}	István Földes (1908–1977) was a Hungarian astronomer and mathematician. From 1949 to 1974, he was the head of the Department of Astronomy at the Eötvös Loránd University. His main field of research was celestial mechanics and he gave popular lectures on astronomy on the radio.	IAU · 549961
549996 Dmitriiguliutin	2011 WX_{132}	Dmitrii Guliutin (born 1965), a Russian historian on space-science and amateur astronomer, who has worked in the aerospace industry and as a researcher in space museums.	IAU · 549996
