= Heim Pál National Pediatric Institute =

Coordinates: 47.4783°N 19.0917°E

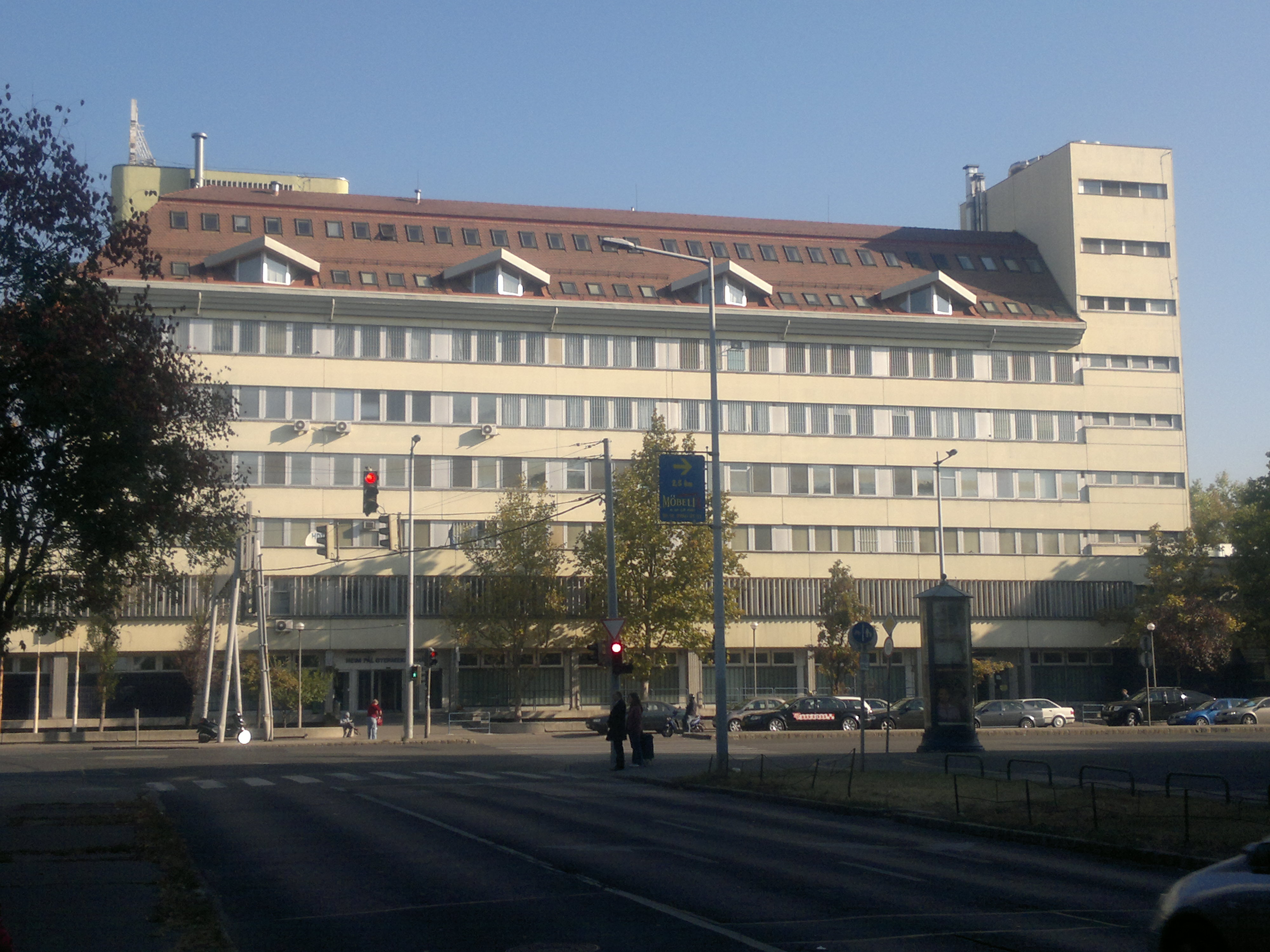
Pál Heim Children's Hospital in Budapest

Heim Pál National Pediatric Institute (Hungarian: Heim Pál Országos Gyermekgyógyászati Intézet) is a children's hospital located in several locations in Budapest, Hungary.

== History ==
Heim Pál National Pediatric Institute was founded on 4 June 1908 as the Hungarian Royal State Children's Asylum (Hungarian: Magyar Királyi Központi Állami Gyermekmenhelyet), an educational and health institution for orphaned children. Throughout and after the First World War, it operated as an orphanage.

After the Second World War, it was renovated and became a national institute for treating children. In 1953 it was named after János Bókai, a famous Hungarian pediatrician of the 19th century, and a few years later, it was renamed after Pál Heim, another famous pediatrician. By this time, the Children's Hospital was operating with 555 beds. In 2005, the Children's Hospital was merged with Madarász utcai Gyermekkórház, another well-known and respected Hungarian children's hospital.
