= Pál Heim =

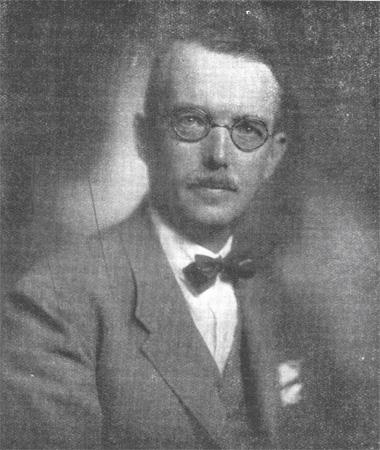
Heim Pál

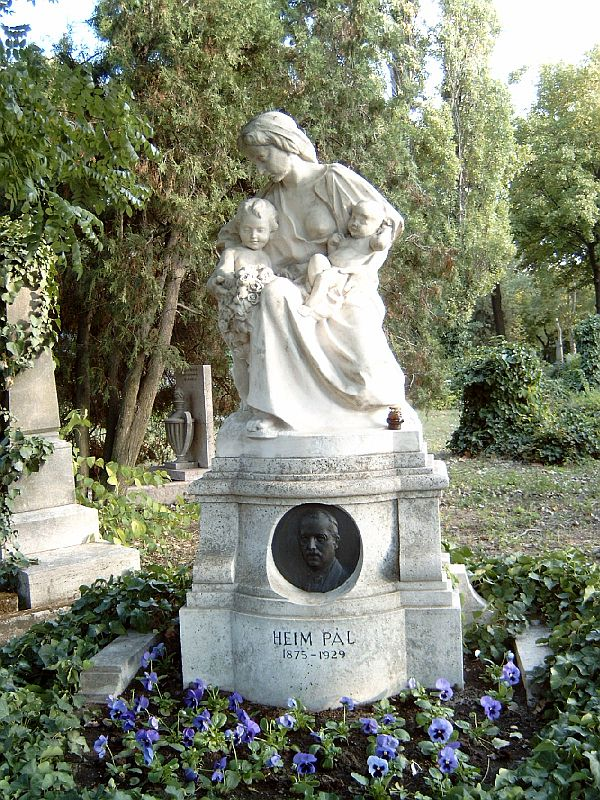
Monument to Pál Heim, by György Vastagh

Pál Heim (Budapest, 30 November 1875 – Budapest, 23 October 1929; Hungarian: Heim Pál) was a Hungarian pediatrician and university professor.

He earned his medical degree in 1897 from the University of Budapest. He subsequently studied in Vienna. Next he left the Austro-Hungarian Empire to study in Breslau, then part of the German Empire where he studied and worked at the clinic of Adalbert Czerny. He then went to Lausanne (in Switzerland) and then in Paris, at the Pasteur Institute.

He served as a medical doctor in the First World War, and in 1916 he became leader of a hospital for babies in Budapest. In 1918 he also began teaching at the university, where he became rector in 1921. He then went to the University of Pécs, where he lived until 1929. He organized a network of nurses to babies, who became known as the "Heim Sisters".

In the autumn of 1928, his former mentor János Bókai retired as head of pediatrics, and Heim was invited to take the post. He accepted the invitation, although he was sorry to leave Pécs. A few months after his appointment, he died from pneumonia at the age of 54. His body was interred at Kerepesi cemetery.

Pál Heim Children's Hospital in Budapest is named for him.
