= Dariusz Piontkowski =

Polish politician and deputy

Dariusz Piontkowski MP
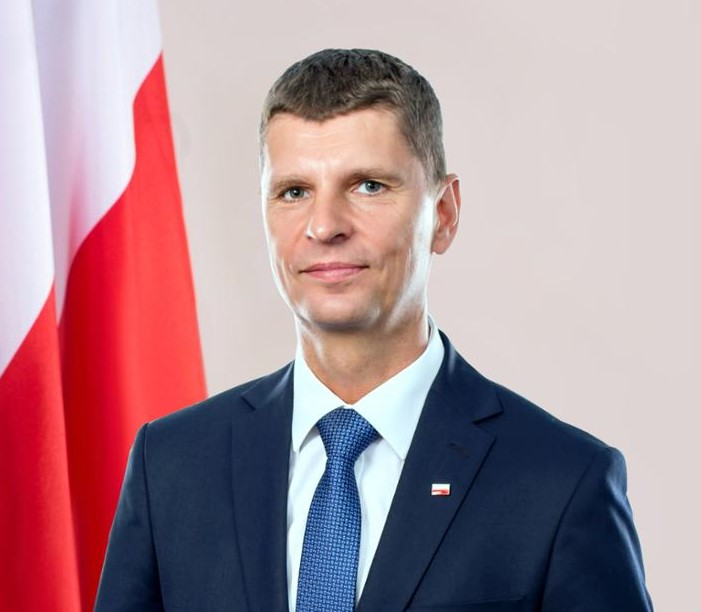
- Official portrait, 2020

Minister of National Education
- In office 4 June 2019 – 19 October 2020
- President: Andrzej Duda
- Prime Minister: Mateusz Morawiecki
- Preceded by: Anna Zalewska
- Succeeded by: Przemysław Czarnek

Marshal of Podlaskie Voivodeship
- In office 29 May 2007 – 15 January 2008
- Preceded by: Janusz Kazimierz Krzyżewski
- Succeeded by: Jarosław Dworzański

Personal details
- Born: December 17, 1964 (age 61) Sielc, Polish People's Republic
- Party: Law and Justice
- Education: Białystok branch of the University of Warsaw; Białystok Academy of Finance and Management
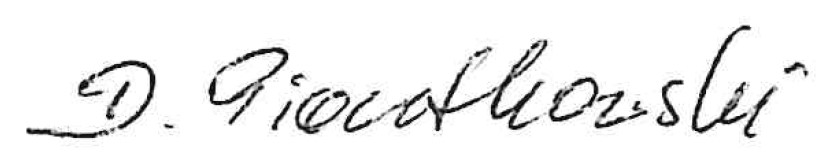
- Signature

Dariusz Piontkowski (born 17 December 1964 in Sielc) is a Polish politician, former marshal of Podlasie province, and current MP (in his third term). From 4 June 2019 to 19 October 2020 he was the minister of national education under Mateusz Morawiecki. He was in charge of the Law and Justice organization in the Podlaskie Voivodeship.

== Biography ==
He graduated in 1988 from the Faculty of Humanities, Branch of the University of Warsaw in Białystok. He also completed postgraduate studies in management (Academy of Finance and Management in Białystok) and at the Białystok School of Public Administration.

He has worked as a teacher at the Adam Mickiewicz High School No. 1 in Białystok. He worked as a teacher at the Adam Mickiewicz High School in Białystok.

From 1990, he was active in the Centre Agreement, then joined Law and Justice. From 1994 to 2007 he sat on the Białystok city council. In the early elections to the Podlaskie Voivodeship Sejmik in 2007, he was elected as a councilor from the Law and Justice party. In May of the same year, after a coalition was formed by PiS and PSL, he was appointed voivodeship marshal. He was dismissed from this function in January 2008 after the balance of power in the assembly changed and an agreement was signed by the Civic Platform, PSL and Podlasie Right, created by some PiS councilors. In 2010, he again became a voivodeship councilor. In 2010, he represented PiS in the elections for the Mayor of Białystok.

He was accused of misappropriating a public function in 2008, which was related to signing documents as the voivodeship marshal after the vote on his dismissal and appointment of a successor. The politician did not admit to being responsible, stating that he was convinced that the cancellation would only take effect at the end of the day. In 2013, the court validly found that he had committed this act, and at the same time, due to the minor social harmfulness, the proceedings were conditionally discontinued for a probation period.

In the national elections of 2011, he was elected as an MP of the 7th term. He became a member of the Education, Science and Youth Committee and the Health Committee. In the 2014 European Parliament elections, he ran from the Law and Justice party in constituency no. 3 (Podlaskie and Warmian-Masurian Voivodeships) and did not win a seat, winning 28,685 votes. In 2015, he successfully ran for parliamentary re-election (he received 28,378 votes). In February 2019, he became the chairman of PiS structures in the Podlaskie Voivodeship.

He twice received the Cross of Merit (Bronze in 2000 and Silver in 2007), awarded by the President of Poland.
