= Jerzy Leszczyński =

The name Jerzy Leszczyński may refer to:

- Jerzy Leszczyński (actor) – Polish actor
- Jerzy Leszczyński (politician) – Polish politician
- Jerzy A. Leszczyński (chemist) – Polish chemist
