= Marian Szamatowicz =

Polish medical professor and politician

Chairman of the Podlaskie Voivodeship Sejmik
- In office 2014–2015
- Preceded by: Bogdan Dyjuk
- Succeeded by: Jarosław Dworzański

Chairman of the Białystok Voivodeship National Council
- In office 29 June 1984 – 24 April 1990
- Preceded by: Marian Kukla
- Succeeded by: Position abolished

Personal details
- Born: 13 February 1935 (age 91) Sztabin, Second Polish Republic
- Citizenship: Poland
- Party: Civic Platform
- Other political affiliations: PZPR (until 1990); Agreement for the Future – CenterLeft; Democratic Left Alliance
- Education: Medical Academy of Warsaw
- Occupation: Physician, politician
- Awards: Order of Polonia Restituta; Honorary citizen of Białystok

Marian Czesław Szamatowicz (born February 13, 1935) is a Polish physician, gynecologist and obstetrician, professor of medical sciences and a politician. In 1987, he performed the first successful in vitro fertilization procedure in Poland. During the communist period, from 1984 to 1990 he served as the chairman of the Białystok Voivodeship National Council and from 2014 to 2015 he served as the chairman of the Podlaskie Voivodeship Sejmik.

== Biography ==
Szamatowicz was born in Sztabin, Poland. In 1960, he graduated with distinction from the Faculty of Medicine of the Medical Academy of Warsaw. He obtained two degrees of specialization – in obstetrics (1965) and women's diseases (1969). He received the academic degree of doctor of medical sciences in 1965, and defended his habilitation in 1972. In 1979, he became an associate professor. In 1990, he received the academic title of professor of medical sciences.

In 1961 he became an employee of the Provincial Obstetrics and Gynecology Hospital in Białystok, and two years later an academic teacher at the Medical Academy in Białystok. From 1972 to 1984 he was the head of the Department of Gynecological Endocrinology, served as deputy director, and in the years 1984–2000 as director of the Institute of Obstetrics and Gynecological Diseases. From 1975 to 1981 he held the position of vice-rector for clinical affairs and postgraduate education. In 1984 he became the head of the Gynecology Clinic. He was a member of the Science Council at the Minister of Science and Higher Education, he headed one of the thematic teams. During the term 2011–2014 he was a member of the Bioethics Committee of the Polish Academy of Sciences.

He has published around 200 scientific publications in Polish and foreign journals, devoted to gynecological endocrinology and reproductive medicine.

=== Political activity ===
During the Polish People's Republic, he was a member of the national council of Patriotic Movement for National Rebirth, and also the chairman of the Presidium of the Provincial National Council in Białystok (1984–1990). In 1989, he ran unsuccessfully for the Senate. In 2009, he opened one of the district lists of candidates for the European Parliament of the coalition committee Agreement for the Future – CenterLeft. In the 2010 local elections, on behalf of the Democratic Left Alliance, he won the mandate of a councillor of the Podlaskie Voivodeship Sejmik of the 4th term. In the 2014 local elections, he successfully ran for re-election as a candidate of the Civic Platform. He then took up the position of chairman of the fifth term of the regional assembly, from which he resigned in 2015. In the 2018 Polish local elections, he ran unsuccessfully for councilor of the next term of the regional assembly from the list of the SLD Left Together committee.

== Awards ==
- Knight's Cross, Officer's Cross, Commander's Cross (2000) and Commander's Cross with Star (2011) of the Order of Polonia Restituta
- Medal of the National Education Commission
- Title of doctor honoris causa of the Medical University of Białystok (2004)
- Honorary citizen of Białystok (2024)
- Busola 2003 Award, awarded by the editorial board of Przegląd
- Prime Minister's Award for the effective development of the in vitro fertilization method (2012)
