= Kaliningrad question =

Controversy over the status of Kaliningrad

Location of Kaliningrad Oblast in Europe in dark green, with mainland Russia in light green

The Kaliningrad question (Note: German: Kaliningrad-Frage or Königsberg-Frage; Lithuanian: Kaliningrado klausimas or Karaliaučiaus klausimas; Polish: Kwestia Kaliningradu or Kwestia Królewca; Russian: Калининградский вопрос, romanized: Kaliningradsky vopros) is a political question concerning the status of Kaliningrad Oblast as an exclave of Russia, and its isolation from the rest of the Baltic region following the 2004 enlargement of the European Union.

In Western media, the region is often discussed in relation to the deployment of missile systems, initially as a response to the deployment of missile defense systems in Poland and the Czech Republic. Russia views the region as a vital element of its ability to project power in the Baltic region.

A fringe position also considers the return of the province to Germany from the Russian Federation. This question is mostly hypothetical, as the German government has stated that it has no claim to it and has formally renounced in international law any right to any lands east of the Oder by ratifying the Treaty on the Final Settlement with Respect to Germany.

== History ==
Kaliningrad, or Königsberg, had been a part of the Teutonic Order, Duchy of Prussia (for nearly 200 years a Polish vassal), Kingdom of Prussia, and the German Empire for 684 years before the Second World War.The historic region of Prussia was originally inhabited by Baltic tribes, the Old Prussians, with their language becoming extinct by the 18th century. Since the Late Middle Ages, the territory of the modern oblast was settled by Germans, Lithuanians (especially Lithuania Minor in the eastern half of the oblast) and Poles (especially Königsberg, Polish: Królewiec, and the current southern border strip with Zinten, Polish: Cynty, and Nordenburg, Polish: Nordenbork). The oblast also contains the eastern part of the Vistula Spit with the now abandoned village of Narmeln (Polish: Polski), which was not part of Ducal Prussia, but of the Pomeranian Voivodeship of the Kingdom of Poland until its annexation by the Kingdom of Prussia in the Second Partition of Poland in 1793.

The first time the territory came under Russian control was during the Seven Year's War (1756–1763), with the region being occupied from 1758 until 1762. With the Treaty of Saint Petersburg (5 May 1762), Russia renounced its claim to Königsberg and returned it to Prussian control.

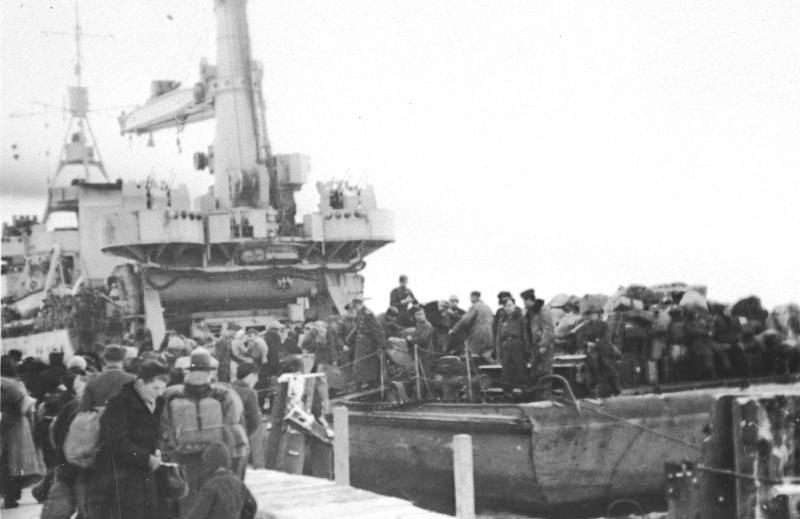
Refugees from Königsberg fleeing to western Germany before the advancing Red Army in 1945

The incorporation of the Königsberg area of East Prussia to Russia became a stated war aim of the Soviet Union at the Tehran Conference in December 1943. In 1945, at the end of World War II, the city was captured by the Soviet Union (see Battle of Königsberg). As agreed by the Allies at the Potsdam Conference, northern East Prussia, including Königsberg, was given to the USSR. Specifically, it became an exclave of the Russian Soviet Federative Socialist Republic (RSFSR), separated from the rest of the republic by the Lithuanian SSR, Latvian SSR and Belorussian SSR. The southern parts of East Prussia became again part of Poland as the historic regions of Warmia, Masuria and Powiśle, previously lost by Poland in 1660 and 1772. Initially, the current southern border strip passed under Polish control with Polish administration organized in the towns of Gierdawy and Iławka, however, the Polish administration was eventually expelled and the area was annexed by the Soviet Union and included within the Kaliningrad Oblast. In 1946, the name of the city of Königsberg was changed to Kaliningrad.

In October 1945, only about 5,000 Soviet civilians lived in the territory. Between October 1947 and October 1948, about 100,000 Germans were forcibly moved to Germany. About 400,000 Soviet civilians arrived by 1948. Some moved voluntarily, but as the number of willing settlers proved insufficient, collective farms were given quotas of how many people they had to send to Kaliningrad. Often they sent the least socially desirable individuals, such as alcoholics or the uneducated.

In the 1950s, Nikita Khrushchev suggested that the Lithuanian SSR should annex Kaliningrad Oblast. The offer was refused by the Lithuanian Communist Party leader Antanas Sniečkus, who did not wish to alter the ethnic composition of his republic. In the late Soviet era, rumors spread that the Oblast might be converted into a homeland for Soviet Germans.

Kaliningrad Oblast remained part of the Soviet Union until its dissolution in 1991, and since then has been an exclave of the Russian Federation. After the Soviet collapse, some descendants of the expellees and refugees traveled to the city to examine their roots. According to the 2010 Russian Census, 7,349 ethnic Germans live in the Oblast, making up 0.8% of the population.

In Germany, the status of Kaliningrad (Königsberg) was one of mainstream political issues until the mid-1960s, when the shifting political discourse increasingly associated similar views with right-wing revisionism.

According to a Der Spiegel article published in 2010, in 1990 the West German government received a message from the Soviet general Geli Batenin, offering to return Kaliningrad. The offer was never seriously considered by the Bonn government, who saw reunification with the East as its priority. However, this story was later debunked by Mikhail Gorbachev, who saw this story as a "false sensation" and rejected the rumours. Nevertheless, during the 1990s some Russian populists, including Vladimir Zhirinovsky and Aleksandr Dugin did in fact seriously consider the handing over of Kaliningrad to Germany as a sort of "grand bargain" that should improve Russian-German relations.

In 2001, the EU was alleged to be in talks with Russia to arrange an association agreement with the Kaliningrad Oblast, at a time when Russia could not repay a £22 billion debt owed to Berlin, which may have given Germany some influence over the territory. Claims of "buying back" Kaliningrad (Königsberg) or other "secret deals" were repudiated by both sides.

Another rumor about a debt-related deal, published by the Russian weekly Nash Continent, alleged that Putin and Edmund Stoiber had agreed on the gradual return of Kaliningrad in return for waiving the country's $50 billion debt to Germany.

The outbreak of the Russo-Ukrainian War and deteriorating conditions between Russia and the West brought Kaliningrad back in the spotlight. Following the annexation of Crimea by Russia in 2014, a select few observers proposed that the Kaliningrad Oblast should be returned to the West. The Baltic Times proposed that the West should take Kaliningrad from Russia in exchange for recognizing its claim over Crimea. This proposal was quoted by several scholarly articles. Observers also noted that Russia's claim over Crimea weakened its territorial claims elsewhere, particularly over Kaliningrad. A few months after the Russian invasion of Ukraine in 2022, Lithuania began implementing European Union sanctions, blocking about 50% of the goods being imported into Kaliningrad by rail, not including food, medicine, or passenger travel. Russia protested the sanctions and announced it would increase shipments by sea. Lithuania lifted the rail sanctions a month later.

== Support for independence ==
Flags used by separatists in Kaliningrad based on the municipal flag of Königsberg

Flags used by separatists in Kaliningrad based on the flag of East Prussia

Since the early 1990s there has been a proposal for independence of the Kaliningrad Oblast from Russia and the formation of a "fourth Baltic state" by some of the local people. The Baltic Republican Party was founded on 1 December 1993 with the aim of founding an autonomous Baltic Republic, restoring the name Königsberg. The party was eventually banned from participating in elections by Kremlin authorities in 2003 due to an election law that banned all regionalist parties by requiring parties to have branches in at least half of Russian subjects.

== Support for irredentism ==
Inesis Feldmanis, head of the Faculty of History and Philosophy at the University of Latvia, has been quoted saying that the Soviet Union's annexation of Kaliningrad is "an error in history".

The Freistaat Preußen Movement, one of the most active offshoots of the Reichsbürger movement, considers the Russian (and German) government as illegitimate and see themselves as the rightful rulers of the region. As of 2017, the movement is split into two competing factions, one based in Königsfeld, Rhineland-Palatinate and the other in Bonn.

=== In Lithuania ===
Some political groups in Lithuania claim parts of Kaliningrad Oblast between the Pregolya and Nemunas rivers (an area known as Lithuania Minor), but they have little influence. Linas Balsys, a former deputy in the Lithuanian parliament, has argued that the status of the exclave should be discussed at international levels.

In 1994, the former Lithuanian head of state Vytautas Landsbergis called for the separation and "decolonization" of Kaliningrad from Russia. In December 1997, the Lithuanian parliament member Romualdas Ozolas expressed his view that Kaliningrad should become an independent republic.

After the annexation of Crimea in 2014, the political analyst Laurynas Kasčiūnas called for a revisiting of the Potsdam Agreement. He claims that residents of Kaliningrad would support a referendum to separate from Russia. The notion of a Lithuanian claim has been brushed off by Russian media, even the liberal Novaya Gazeta newspaper dismissing it as a "geopolitical fantasy".

=== In Poland ===
More than in the form of Polish irredentism over the Kaliningrad Oblast, a Polish annexation of the region has been more mentioned by Russian media, which has accused the Polish authorities of preparing to incorporate the region. These accusations stemmed from online comments made by readers of an article published on the Polish newspaper Gazeta Wyborcza: while the article itself did not mention any alleged desire for annexation by Poland, the comments suggested that the Kaliningrad Oblast should belong to Poland. Pro-Kremlin media such as Pravda.ru misleadingly reported this as an attempt by the Polish government to annex the region. Stanisław Żaryn, spokesperson for the Polish Minister Coordinator for Special Services, dismissed the allegation as "fake news".

=== German resettlement attempts ===
The Amtshagen settlement in 1997.

In the 1990s, organisations with ties to far-right politics in Germany began to collect money to purchase land in Kaliningrad Oblast, to enable ethnic Germans to settle there. In particular, Gesellschaft für Siedlungsförderung in Trakehnen attempted to establish a settlement in Yasnaya Polyana, known in German as Trakehnen. A separate group, affiliated with convicted terrorist Manfred Roeder collected donations to build housing for ethnic Germans in the village of Olkhovatka, in Gusevsky District, east of Kaliningrad.

At Yasnaya Polyana/Trakehnen, fundraising by the organization Aktion Deutsches Königsberg financed the construction of a German-language school and housing in the neighboring village of Amtshagen. Several dilapidated houses were bought and renovated; tractors, trucks, building materials and machinery were imported into the village. The relatively high salaries attracted newcomers, and the ethnic German population rose to about 400 inhabitants. Most of the settlers were Russian Germans from the Caucasus and Kazakhstan, rather than returnees, or their descendants. Some of the Russian Germans were reportedly unable to speak German and/or had been rejected as immigrants to Germany, due to insufficient evidence of substantial German ancestry. The construction of a second settlement on the outskirts of Trakehnen, named Agnes-Miegel-Siedlung, began in 1998.

Relations between the local Russian administration and the Trakehnen project were initially cordial, but the activities of the group were suppressed by the Russian government after being publicized by German media. Dietmar Munier, the initiator of the project, was banned from traveling to Kaliningrad Oblast. In 2006, he sold his stake in the association to one Alexander Mantai, who turned it into a for-profit concern and evicted the original settlers. The association was liquidated in 2015 for violating the Russian law on NGOs.

== Official positions ==
Although negotiations in 2001 were instigated around a possible Russian trade deal with the EU, that would have put the exclave within Germany's economic sphere of influence, the German government led by Angela Merkel subsequently indicated that it had no interest in recovering Kaliningrad Oblast. The governments of Poland and Lithuania similarly recognize Kaliningrad as part of Russia, as does the European Union. Germany formally waived all territorial claims to the former East Prussia as part of the Two Plus Four Agreement that led to German reunification. In July 2005, the German Chancellor Gerhard Schröder declared that "in its heart [the city] will always be called Königsberg", but stated that Germany did not have any territorial claim to it. According to Ulrich Speck, the prospect of returning Kaliningrad to Germany lacks support in Germany, even among fringe nationalist groups. In 2004, the German politician Jürgen Klimke asked the German federal government about its view on the establishment of a Lithuanian-Russian-Polish euroregion, to be named "Prussia". The initiator denied any revanchist connotations to the proposal.

After the collapse of the Soviet Union, Russia's claim to Kaliningrad was not contested by any government, however some groups in Lithuania called for the annexation of the province, or parts of it.

Poland has made no claim to Kaliningrad, and is seen as being unlikely to do so, as it was a beneficiary of the Potsdam Agreement, which also decided the status of Kaliningrad.

== See also ==
- Prussian nationalism
- Karelian question
- Kuril Islands dispute
- Landsmannschaft Ostpreußen, organization for East Prussian refugees/expellees
- Suwałki Gap
- Královec Region, a satirical Czech annexation of Kaliningrad
