= Jarosław Dworzański =

Polish politician

Chairman of Podlaskie Voivodeship Sejmik
- In office 2015 – March 2018
- Preceded by: Marian Szamatowicz
- Succeeded by: Jacek Piorunek

Marshal of Podlaskie Voivodeship
- In office 15 January 2008 – 8 December 2014
- Preceded by: Dariusz Piontkowski
- Succeeded by: Mieczysław Baszko

Personal details
- Born: 3 July 1955 (age 71) Bakałarzewo, Polish People's Republic
- Citizenship: Poland
- Party: Civic Platform
- Education: Academy of Physical Education
- Occupation: Educator, politician
- Awards: Cross of Merit

Jarosław Zygmunt Dworzański (born July 3, 1955 in Białystok) is Polish politician, local government official and a teacher who served as Marshal of Podlaskie Voivodeship from 2008 to 2014 and chairman of the Podlaskie Voivodeship Sejmik from 2015 to 2018.

== Biography ==
He graduated from the Academy of Physical Education in Warsaw. For many years he worked as a teacher and principal of Primary School No. 34 in Białystok. In 2007 he took up the position of director of the Municipal Sports and Recreation Center.

In the local government elections in 2002 he unsuccessfully ran for the Podlaskie Voivodeship Sejmik from the POPiS list, as a candidate of the Civic Platform. In the elections in 2006 from the PO list he won the mandate of a councilor of the regional assembly. He was re-elected in the early provincial elections in May 2007. In January 2008, he was appointed to the position of Voivodeship marshal. In 2010, he retained his mandate as councilor, and on January 10, 2011, he was entrusted with the function of provincial marshal of the 4th term.

In February 2011, the prosecutor of the District Prosecutor's Office in Olsztyn brought five charges against him, including exceeding his authority and accepting a promise of personal benefit in exchange for employment. In October 2011, the prosecutor discontinued the investigation, stating that he had not committed the acts he was accused of.

In 2014, Jarosław Dworzański was re-elected as provincial councilor. In November 2015, he replaced Marian Szamatowicz as chairman of the Podlaskie regional assembly. In December 2017, he left PO, and in March 2018 he was dismissed from the position of chairman of the regional assembly. In the elections of the same year, he ran again for the provincial government from the Civic Coalition list, and obtained the mandate as a result of Zbigniew Nikitorowicz's resignation submitted before the beginning of his term. He later returned to the Civic Platfrorm and took a seat on the party's regional council. In 2024, he retained his mandate as a councilor of the regional assembly for another term.
