= Municipal Hospital in Białystok =

Municipal Hospital in Białystok Szpital Miejski im. PCK w Białymstoku
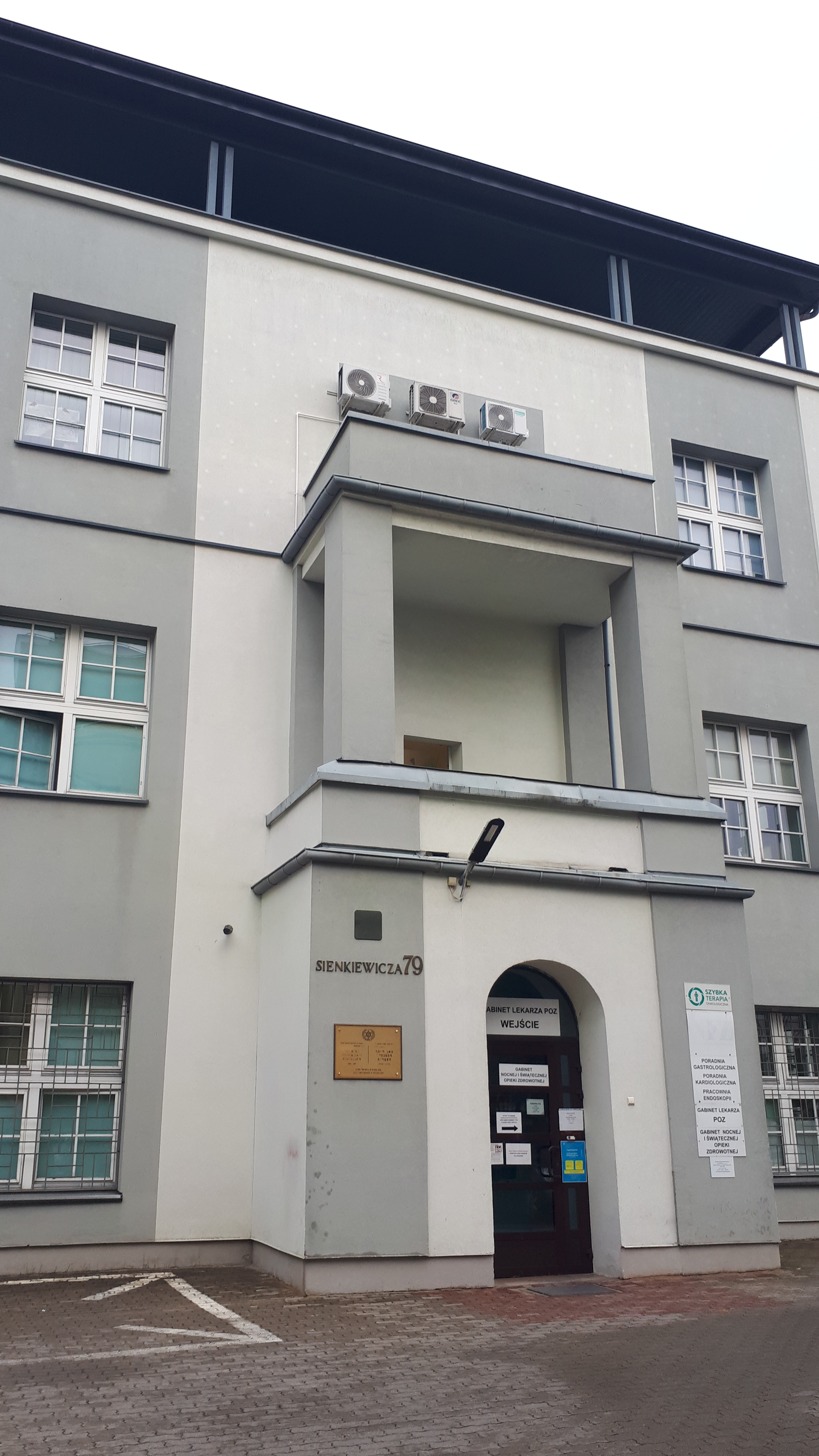

Geography
- Location: Białystok, Podlaskie Voivodeship, Poland
- Coordinates: 53.140420850°N 23.1713248202°E

Organisation
- Care system: National Health Fund

Services
- Emergency department: Yes

Helipads
- Helipad: No

History
- Founded: 1960

Links
- Website: http://www.szpitalpck.pl
- Lists: Hospitals in Poland

PCK Municipal Hospital in Białystok (Polish: Samodzielny Szpital Miejski im. PCK w Białymstoku) is a municipal hospital in Białystok, the capital of Podlaskie Voivodeship in north-eastern Poland. The hospital is located in 79 Sienkiewicza Street, in a building which was built around 1919 and was used as a Hebrew Gymnasium. In addition the hospital operates occupational medicine clinic in Białówny street.

== History ==
Following the end of the Second World War the healthcare situation in Białystok was extremely bad with only few dozens of doctors left in the city. As the city began rebuilding itself as well as its healthcare system, few hospitals under the jurisdiction of the city hall were operated in the few buildings that have survived the war: The First Municipal Hospital was located at 15 Warszawska Street, in the premises of the former Jewish hospital. There were obstetrics, gynaecology and surgery departments there. A children's ward, the only one in the voivodeship at that time, and an internal medicine ward were soon established in the added buildings. The hospital had 205 beds, and Dr. Józef Hamerla became its director. The Second Municipal Hospital at 5 Sosnowa Street survived thanks to the heroic attitude of director Henryk Rożkowski. In the last days of the German occupation, a special group of soldiers arrived with the intention of setting it on fire. Dr. Rożkowski, risking his own life and that of his closest associates, opposed this, asking for time to evacuate. The officer was persuaded, but announced that the hospital would be burnt down ruthlessly. Fortunately, the Germans did not return and the hospital was able to start operating already in the first days of August 1944. There was an infectious diseases ward here and for a long time Dr. Rożkowski was the only doctor. The Third Municipal Hospital (PCK) was located at 29 Warszawska street. Here too, the conditions did not meet even the minimum needs for the treatment of patients. The laboratory facility was one room with an area of only 20 sqm.

In 1960, in accordance with a resolution of the City National Council of Białystok (Polish: Miejska Rada Narodowa w Białymstoku), the city's municipal council, the PCK Municipal Hospital in Białystok was established and formally began its operations on March 1. The director of the hospital was Dr. Mieczysław Nietupski, who was also the head of one of the wards. On September 15, 1973, the hospital lost its independence. The then authorities, by combining two treatment facilities operating in Białystok and creating the Municipal Healthcare Complex (Polish: Miejski Zespół Opieki Zdrowotnej), included the Municipal Hospital in its structure. As a result of these changes, the Department of Specialist Care was extended to the 1st and 2nd Department of Internal Diseases of the Municipal Hospital. Zenon Rudziński became the first director of the MZOZ and thus the hospital. On August 1, 2000, By resolution of the City Council of February 21, 2000 received a new statue in accordance with which it regained independence. The Municipal Health Care Complex in Białystok (Polish: Miejski Zespół Opieki Zdrowotnej w Białymstoku) was absorbed into it, and the hospital received a separate legal identity, management and decision-making structure. Dr. Andrzej Adam Kałużyński, internal medicine specialist employed in the hospital as a senior assistant at the Department of Internal Medicine with a cardiological profile became its director. Soon after gaining independence, the first restructuring activities began. By decision of the Director, the kitchen was liquidated. The nutrition of the patients was outsourced to an external catering.

The function of director by Dr. Andrzej Kałużyński coincided with huge difficulties in the health service and, above all, with the so-called "lex 203" which introduced mandatory increases in salaries of health care personnel, without indicating the sources of their financing. The lack of implementation of the provisions of the act cast a shadow on interpersonal relations in the hospital. On November 30, 2003, the director resigned from his post and the next day Krzysztof Aureliusz Teodoruk took over. In 2004, the hospital absorbed a number of outpatient clinics: Rehabilitation Clinic at 2 Bema street and 24 Swobodna street, Childbirth Schools at Warszawska Street (now in 2 Bema street), Alcohol Addiction and Codependency Therapy Clinic at 5 Torczykowa street (until 2013) and the Occupational Medicine and Sterilization Clinic at Białówny street On 18 October 2007, the Cardiology clinic was opened, equipped with a ECG machine and a cyloergometer with a treadmill.

In 2019 the hospital's statue was amended by the Białystok City Council. In November 2020, following the retirement of Krzysztof Teodoruk, the city president Tadeusz Truskolaski appointed Agnieszka Uszyńska. In May 2021 the hospital received around 3 million zlotych from the Podlaskie Voivodeship Marshal's office in a ceremony with the participation of the voivodeship marshal Artur Kosicki and the hospital director Agnieszka Uszyńska.
