= Mieczysław Baszko =

Polish politician

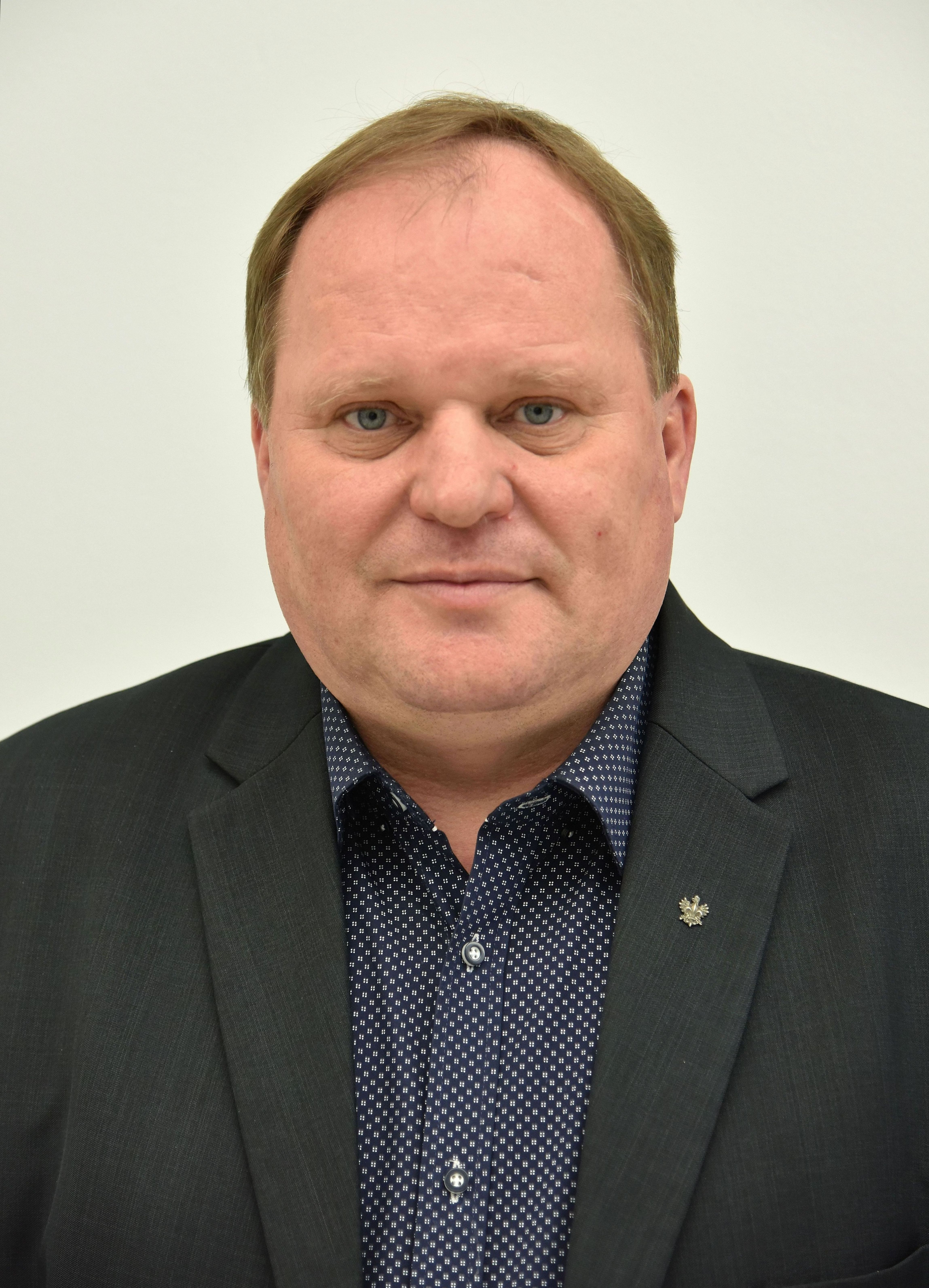

Member of the Sejm
- In office 12 November 2015 – 12 November 2023
- Constituency: 24 – Białystok

Marshal of Podlaskie Voivodeship
- In office 8 December 2014 – 25 October 2015
- Preceded by: Jarosław Dworzański
- Succeeded by: Jerzy Leszczyński

Personal details
- Born: 26 June 1961 (age 65) Boratyńszczyzna, Polish People's Republic
- Citizenship: Poland
- Party: Polish People's Party
- Education: University of Białystok
- Occupation: Politician

Mieczysław Kazimierz Baszko (born 26 June 1961 in Boratyńszczyzna) – is a Polish politician, from 2014 to 2015 marshal of the Podlaskie Voivodeship, member of the VIII and IX Sejm. Member of The Republicans since 2021. Agreement member in 2018–2021, until 2018 member of PSL.
