= Łukasz Prokorym =

Polish politician and jurist

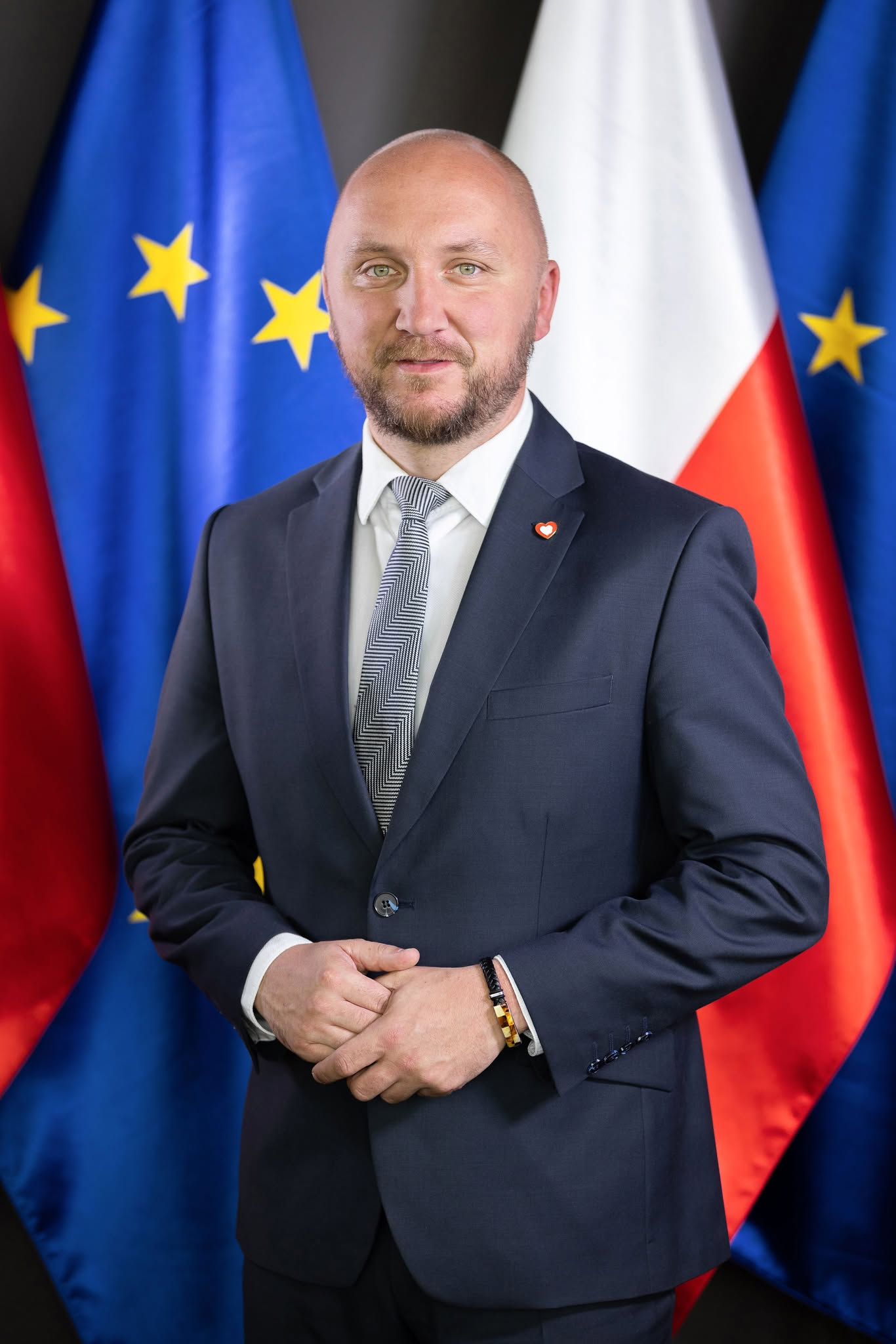

Marshal of Podlaskie Voivodeship
- Incumbent
- Assumed office 7 May 2024
- Preceded by: Artur Kosicki

Białystok City Council chairman
- In office 2018–2024
- Preceded by: Mariusz Gromko
- Succeeded by: Katarzyna Jamróz

Personal details
- Born: 23 July 1985 (age 41) Białystok, Polish People's Republic
- Citizenship: Poland
- Party: Civic Platform
- Education: University of Białystok
- Occupation: Lawyer, politician

Łukasz Prokorym (born 23 July 1985) is a Polish politician who is serving since May 2024 as Marshal of Podlaskie Voivodeship.

== Biography ==
He was born in Białystok and studied in University of Białystok. In the 2018 Polish local elections he ran in the election with Civic Platform to the Białystok City Council and won there a seat and in addition he was elected as the chairman of that body. In the 2024 Polish local elections he headed the Civic Platform list for the Podlaskie Voivodeship Sejmik and became a deputy. During the first session of the new legislature he was elected the Marshal of Podlaskie Voivodeship after gaining additional votes from two PiS deputies, Wiesława Burnos and Marek Malinowski, ousting the incumbent Marshal, Artur Kosicki.
