= Artur Kosicki =

Polish politician and jurist

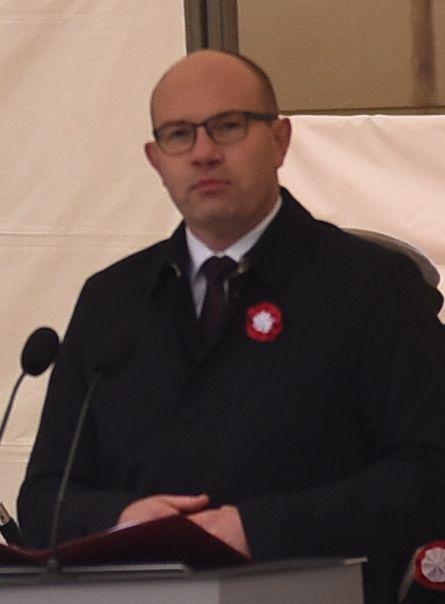
- Kosicki during the National Independence Day celebrations in Kościuszko Square in Białystok.

Marshal of Podlaskie Voivodeship
- In office 11 December 2018 – 7 May 2024
- Preceded by: Jerzy Leszczyński
- Succeeded by: Łukasz Prokorym

Personal details
- Born: 13 September 1978 (age 48) Grajewo, Polish People's Republic
- Citizenship: Poland
- Party: Law and Justice
- Children: 2
- Education: University of Białystok
- Occupation: Lawyer, politician
- Awards: Order of Polonia Restituta; Medal of Merit for the Border Guard

Artur Kosicki (born 13 September 1978) is a Polish politician and jurist. From December 2018 to May 2024 he server as Marshal of Podlaskie Voivodeship.

== Biography ==
In the years 1997–2004 he was a member of the disco polo band Boys, where he dealt mainly with dancing, sometimes also singing. He graduated in law from the University of Białystok.

In 2005 he became professionally involved with public administration. He worked in the district office in Białystok, then in the Department of Architecture of the Municipal Office in Białystok. He became an expert in the Housing Council of the Prime Minister, in 2016 he became an advisor to the Minister of Agriculture and Rural Development, Krzysztof Jurgiel. Then he started working at the Ministry of Development. He also became a lecturer in various postgraduate studies at the University of Białystok. In November 2017, he became the chairman of the Law and Justice party in Białystok. In the 2018 local government elections, he was elected a councilor of the Podlaskie Voivodeship Sejmik of the 6th convocation. He was elected chairman of the PiS council club in this body. On December that year he became the Marshal of Podlaskie Voivodeship, succeeding Jerzy Leszczyński. and served in that position until May 2024 when he was replaced by Łukasz Prokorym.
