= Mariusz Gromko =

Polish politician (born 1978)

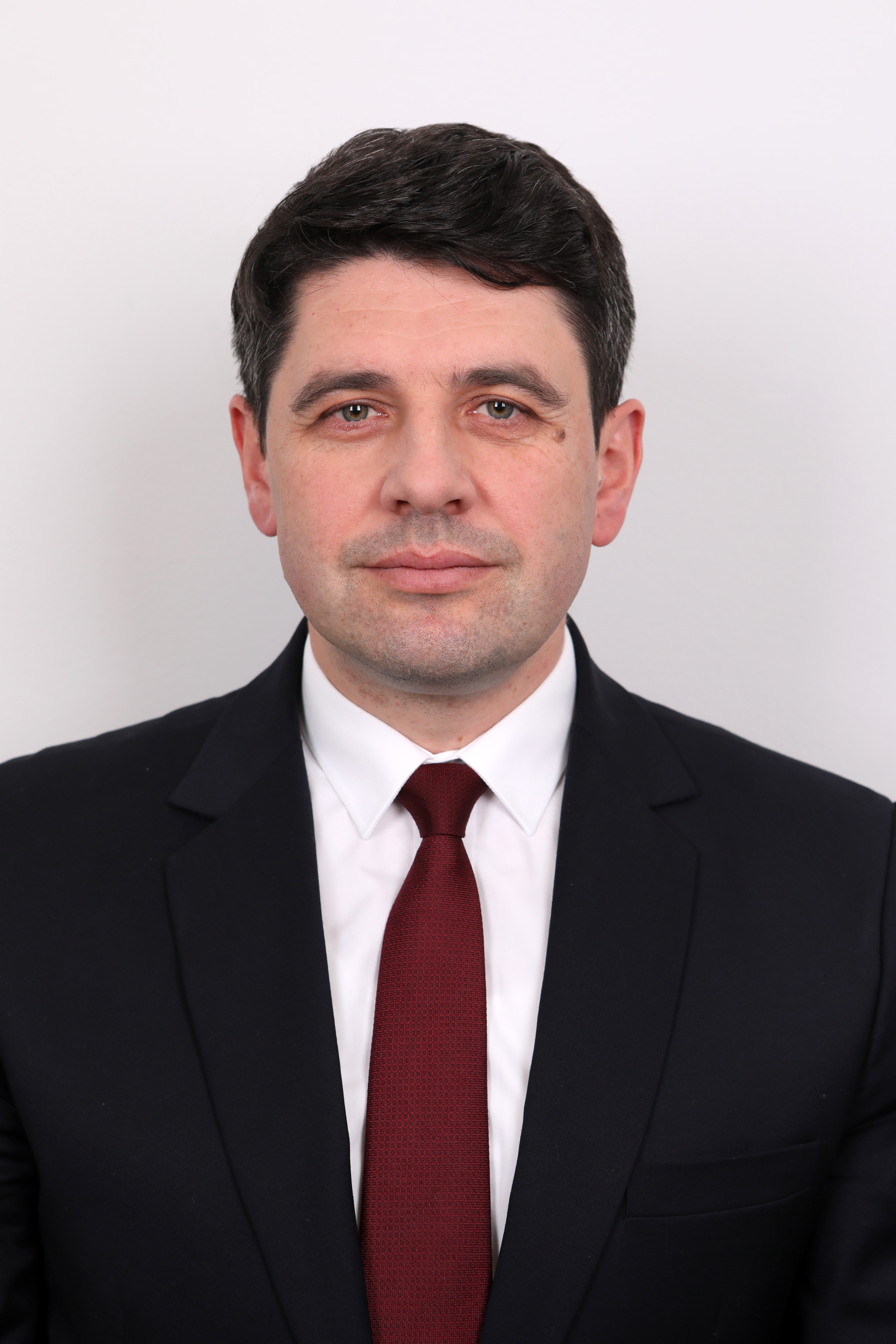

Member of the Podlaskie Voivodeship Sejmik
- Incumbent
- Assumed office 2024

Member of the Senate of Poland
- In office 2019–2023

Chairman of the Białystok City Council
- In office 2013–2018
- Preceded by: Włodzimierz Leszek Kusak
- Succeeded by: Łukasz Prokorym

Personal details
- Born: 1 July 1978 (age 48) Białystok, Polish People's Republic
- Party: Law and Justice
- Education: Białystok Academy of Finance and Management

Mariusz Krzysztof Gromko (born 1 July 1978) is a Polish politician. He was elected to the Senate of Poland (10th term) representing the constituency of Białystok.

== Biography ==
An economist by education, in 2002 he obtained a master's degree from the Academy of Finance and Management in Białystok. In the same year, he started his own business in the trade industry. He became involved in political activities within the Law and Justice party.

In 2006, 2010, 2014 and 2018, he was elected as a city councilor in Białystok. He served as chairman of the PiS councilors' club. From 2014 to 2018, he was the chairman of the Białystok City Council, then he became the vice-chairman of this body. He was the initiator of restoring estate councils in the city and one of the initiators of appointing priest Michał Sopoćko as the patron saint of Białystok.

In the 2019 parliamentary elections, he ran for the Senate of the Republic of Poland on behalf of Law and Justice in district no. 60. He was elected senator of the 10th term, receiving 104,694 votes. He was then appointed Secretary of the Senate.
