= Jerzy Leszczyński (politician) =

Polish politician

Marshal of Podlaskie Voivodeship
- In office 9 November 2015 – 11 December 2018
- Preceded by: Mieczysław Baszko
- Succeeded by: Artur Kosicki

Personal details
- Born: 8 February 1961 (age 65) Ciechanowiec, Polish People's Republic
- Citizenship: Poland
- Party: Polish People's Party
- Education: Warsaw University of Life Sciences
- Occupation: Politician

Jerzy Leszczyński (born February 8, 1961, in Ciechanowiec) is a Polish politician, civil servant and local government official, who served from 2014 to 2018 a member of the Podlaskie Voivodeship executive board and from 2015 to 2018 as the Marshal of the Podlaskie Voivodeship.

== Biography ==
He graduated from the Catholic St. Augustine High School in Warsaw in 1980, and in 1985 from the Faculty of Agriculture of the Warsaw University of Life Sciences. He worked at the Mazowiecko-Podlaski Open-Air Museum of Agriculture in Ciechanowiec, then from 1987 to 2002 at the Agricultural Advisory Center in Szepietowo. Since 2002, he has been professionally associated with the Agency for Restructuring and Modernisation of Agriculture, becoming deputy director of the Podlaskie regional branch based in Łomża.

An activist of the agricultural self-government within agricultural chambers, appointed to the provincial board of the Polish People's Party. In the parliamentary elections of 2011 and 2015, he unsuccessfully ran for a seat in parliament.

In 2014, he was elected as a councilor of the Podlaskie Voivodeship Sejmik, then he took up the position of a member of the newly established provincial board. On November 9, 2015, he was appointed as the new marshal of the Podlaskie province, replacing Mieczysław Baszko. In 2018 and 2024, he was again elected as a provincial councilor. On November 22, 2018, Artur Kosicki was elected as the new marshal, but the full provincial board was not elected at that time. Jerzy Leszczyński ended his term of office after it was completed on December 11, 2018.

In 2019, he took the position of secretary of the Gmina Klukowo, and in connection with that, he resigned from membership in the PSL. In the elections of the same year, he unsuccessfully ran for a parliamentary seat from the PSL list. In 2023, he ran for the Sejm on behalf of the Third Way, co-founded by the PSL party.
