= Restrictions on transit to Kaliningrad Oblast =

2022 Lithuanian sanction against Russia

Kaliningrad Oblast (dark green) of Russia (light green) within Europe

A series of restrictions on transit through Lithuania between the Russian semi-exclave of Kaliningrad Oblast and mainland Russia were implemented during the 2022 Russian invasion of Ukraine. The restrictions extended only to sanctioned goods and began on 18 June 2022. The rail restrictions were lifted one month later on 23 July.

== History of transit ==
Russia and Lithuania negotiated a simplified transit regime to Kaliningrad in the late 1990s. Initially, Russia pushed for a right to have a military corridor, but Lithuania refused as it would breach the country's sovereignty. The agreement was signed and the simplified transit mechanism began operating on 1 July 2003, with Lithuania fully regulating the rules of the transit. When Lithuania joined the EU in 2004, it also joined the common policy on economic sanctions.

== Timeline ==
=== June 2022 ===
The restriction was introduced on 18 June 2022, against Russia as a sanction following its invasion of Ukraine. Among other things, the transit of coal, metals, cement, wood, building materials and high-tech products by railway transport was stopped. The governor of the Kaliningrad Oblast, Anton Alikhanov, said that the ban affected 40–50% of cargo transported between the region and the rest of Russia. On 21 June Lithuania extended restrictions on freight vehicles as well.

In response, the Russian delegation began to openly threaten Lithuania. Andrey Arkadyevich Klimov, the head of the temporary commission of the Federation Council for the protection of sovereignty, said that if the EU "does not correct the situation with the blockade, it will free Russia's hands to solve this problem by any means". Russia expressed an official protest to Lithuania.

On 22 June, the United States reminded Russia that NATO's commitment to defend Lithuania was "ironclad".

Representatives of Lithuania stated that they were ready to disconnect Russia from the regional energy system. On 24 June, President of Lithuania Gitanas Nauseda said "the Russian Federation would not dare to attack a country that is a member of NATO".

On 29 June the head of the Committee of the Federation Council of the Russian Federation on International Affairs, Vladimir Dzhabarov, suggested that Russia could use military force against Lithuania.

=== July 2022 ===
On 11 July Lithuania expanded restrictions on the transit of goods, starting the phased introduction of sanctions announced by the EU. The list included concrete, wood, alcohol and alcohol-based industrial chemicals.

On 13 July the European Commission published an explanation for member states regarding the transit of goods from Russia to Kaliningrad, confirming the legality of Lithuania's actions. The Ministry of Foreign Affairs of Lithuania stated that they were following the recommendations and would check all goods as much as possible in order to make it impossible for Russia to violate the terms of the sanctions.

On 23 July Lithuania removed rail transit restrictions for Kaliningrad after the EU revised its sanction recommendations to only apply to road transit and not rail.

== See also ==
- 2022 Russia–European Union gas dispute
- 2022 Russian debt default
- Kaliningrad question
- Karelia question
- Suwałki Gap
- International sanctions during the 2022 Russian invasion of Ukraine
