= Suwałki Gap =

Lithuania–Poland border area

Coordinates: 54.2°N 23.4°E

The Suwałki Gap, also known as the Suwałki corridor (Note: The term "Suwałki corridor" (korytarz suwalski) may refer both to the Suwałki Gap and the road link between Kaliningrad Oblast and (Russian ally) Belarus that was proposed by Russians in the 1990s) (Note: Also known in other languages as: Polish: przesmyk suwalski or korytarz suwalski; Lithuanian: Suvalkų koridorius or Suvalkų tarpas; Belarusian: сувальскі калідор, romanized: suvalski kalidor and Russian: сувалкский коридор, romanized: suvalkskij koridor) ([suˈvawkʲi]), is a sparsely populated area around the border between Lithuania and Poland, and centres on the shortest path between Belarus and the Russian exclave of Kaliningrad Oblast on the Polish side of the border. Named after the Polish town of Suwałki, this choke point has become of great strategic and military importance since Poland and the Baltic states joined the North Atlantic Treaty Organization (NATO).

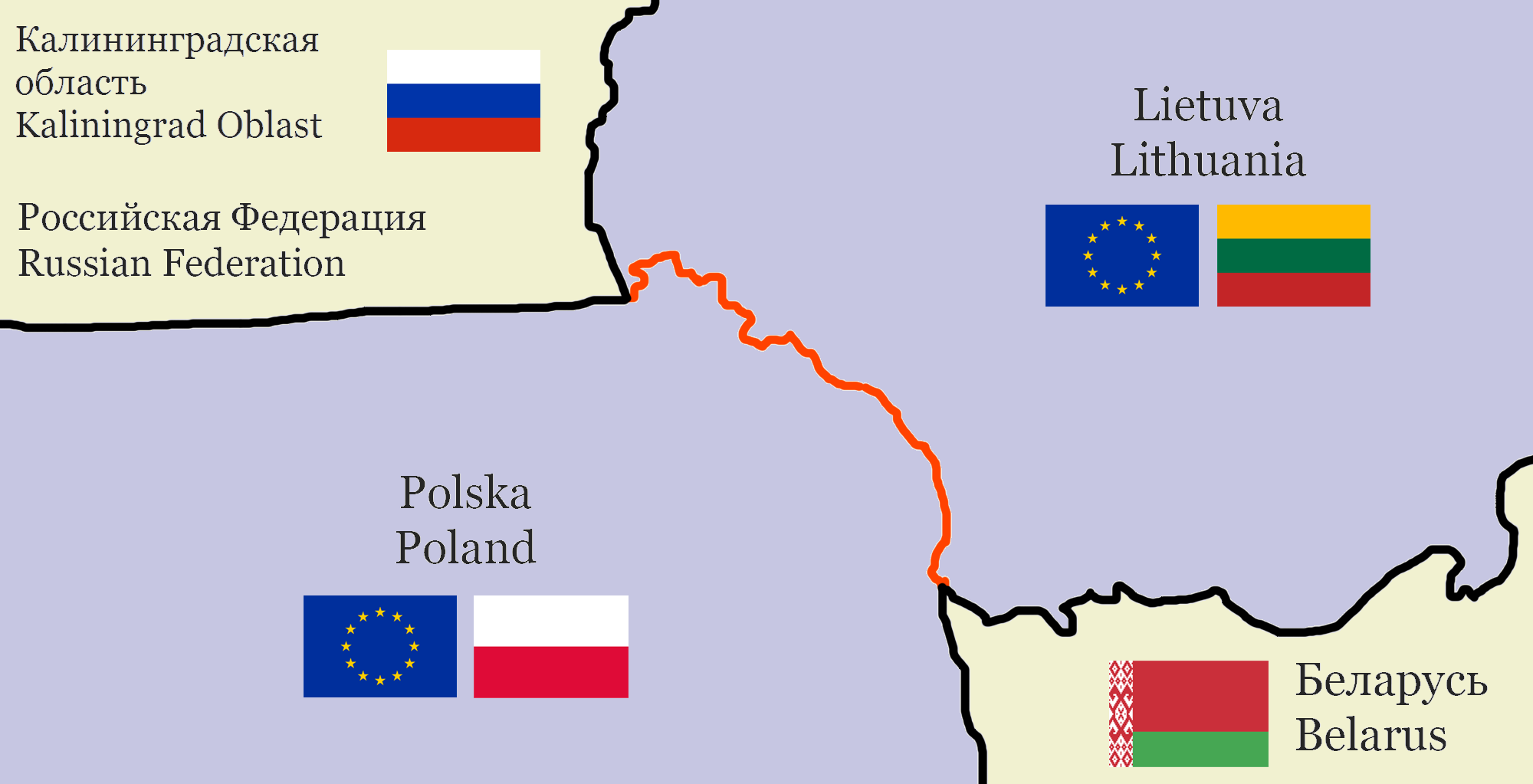
Close-up at the Suwałki Gap Lithuania–Poland border

Map of Europe: NATO countries CSTO countries Lithuania–Poland border

The border between Poland and Lithuania in the area of the Suwałki Gap was formed after the Suwałki Agreement of 1920, but it carried little importance in the interwar period as at the time, the Polish lands stretched farther northeast. During the Cold War, Lithuania was part of the Soviet Union and communist Poland was a member of the Soviet-led Warsaw Pact alliance. The dissolution of the Soviet Union and the Warsaw Pact hardened borders that cut through the shortest land route between Kaliningrad (Russian territory isolated from the mainland) and Belarus, Russia's ally.

As the Baltic states and Poland eventually joined NATO, this narrow border stretch between Poland and Lithuania became a vulnerability for the military bloc because, if a hypothetical military conflict were to erupt between Russia and Belarus on one side and NATO on the other, capturing the 65 km (40 mi)-long strip of land between Russia's Kaliningrad Oblast and Belarus would likely jeopardise NATO's attempts to defend the Baltic states, because it would cut off the only land route there. NATO's fears about the Suwałki Gap intensified after 2014, when Russia annexed Crimea and launched the war in Donbas, and further increased after Russia started a full-scale invasion of Ukraine in February 2022. These worries prompted the alliance to increase its military presence in the area, and an arms race was triggered by these events.

Both Russia and the European Union countries also saw great interest in civilian uses of the gap. In the 1990s and early 2000s, Russia attempted to negotiate an extraterritorial corridor to connect its exclave of Kaliningrad Oblast with Grodno in Belarus. Poland, Lithuania and the EU did not consent. Movement of goods through the gap was disrupted in summer 2022, during the Russian invasion of Ukraine, as Lithuania and the European Union introduced transit restrictions on Russian vehicles as part of their sanctions. The Via Baltica road, a vital sea and road link connecting Finland and the Baltic states with the rest of the European Union, passes through the area. There is an expressway connection from the Polish side, the new S61 expressway, while the A5 highway in Lithuania is being upgraded to a divided highway. The Rail Baltica route near the Suwałki Gap is under construction.

== Background ==
The Suwałki Gap is a sparsely populated region in the north-eastern corner of Poland, in Podlaskie Voivodeship. This hilly area, one of the coldest in Poland, is located on the western margins of the East European Plain. It is crossed by numerous river valleys and deep lakes (such as Hańcza and Wigry), and its vast swathes are covered by thick forests (including the Augustów Primeval Forest) and marshes, such as those in the Biebrza National Park. To its west lies another lake district known as Masuria. The area is relatively poorly developed - there is little industry besides forestry-related facilities, the road network is sparse and the nearest large airport is located several hundred kilometres away; only two major roads (with at least one lane in each direction) and one rail line link Poland with Lithuania. The area is home to some ethnic minorities, particularly Ukrainians, Lithuanians (close to the border with Lithuania) and Russians, but the Russians are sparse on the Polish side.

Poland and Lithuania both gained independence in the aftermath of World War I and started to fight in order to establish control over as much terrain as they could militarily hold. While Lithuania claimed the majority-Polish Suwałki and Vilnius, it ultimately failed to control both. Suwałki was agreed to be part of Poland as a result of the Suwałki Agreement, while Vilnius was captured by Poland in a false flag operation known as Żeligowski's mutiny. In the interwar period, the Suwałki region was a protrusion of Poland into surrounding Lithuania and East Prussia (part of Germany), rather than a gap, and was of little strategic importance.

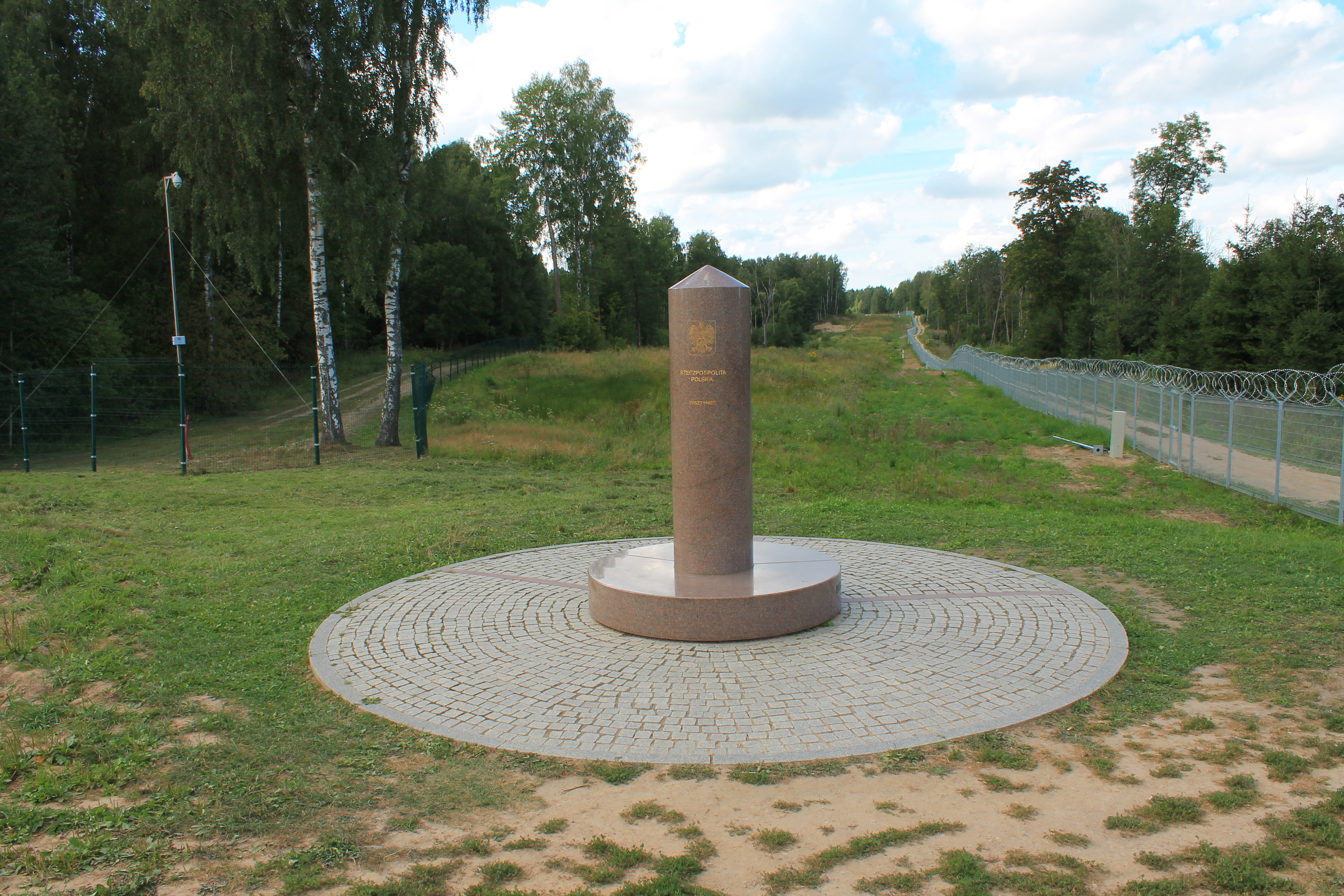
The Russia–Lithuania–Poland tripoint near Vištytis, photographed from the Polish side, marks the northwestern end of the Suwałki Gap. Russia is to the left and Lithuania is to the right

Following World War II, the vicinity of Königsberg, renamed Kaliningrad shortly after the war, was incorporated as part of the Russian SFSR, part of the Soviet Union, and became a closed area for most of the Soviet era. Lithuania became a Union republic within the USSR, while Poland came under the Soviet sphere of influence and joined the Warsaw Pact. Until the dissolution of the Soviet Union, Poland's only eastern and northern neighbour was the USSR, thus, as in the interwar period, the region mattered little in military terms. This changed after 1991, when Kaliningrad Oblast became a semi-exclave of Russia, sandwiched between Poland and Lithuania, both of which are neighbours with Belarus. Neither borders the "mainland" part of Russia.

Kaliningrad Oblast's neighbours both entered the European Union and the North Atlantic Treaty Organization (NATO). At the same time, only 65 km (40 mi) of Polish territory separates two areas of the rival Collective Security Treaty Organisation (CSTO) and the Union State, both of which include Russia and Belarus. The former Estonian President Toomas Hendrik Ilves claims to have come up with the name "Suwałki Gap" before his meeting with Ursula von der Leyen, then serving as the defence minister of Germany, in April 2015 to highlight the vulnerability of the area for the Baltic states.

== Civilian interests ==
=== Russian corridor ===
The first time a special corridor between Kaliningrad and Belarus (planned to go via Poland) was discussed during a 1990 meeting between Yuri Shemonov, a senior official in Kaliningrad Oblast, and Nikolai Ryzhkov and Mikhail Gorbachev, Premier and President of the Soviet Union, respectively. While Ryzhkov was supportive of the idea, Gorbachev vetoed the proposal, urging the other two men to "stop spreading panic".

After the Soviet Union fell apart, Kaliningrad was cut off from Russia, thus the Russians sought to secure a land transit route from the exclave to mainland Russia through Belarus. After some initial preparations, including signing a treaty which obliged Poland and Russia to open a border crossing near Gołdap, the Russian government announced their intention to build a special "communication corridor" between the checkpoint and Grodno in Belarus, justifying the decision by the region's close economic ties with the country. Russia, which communicated the idea to the Polish side in 1994, additionally sought to bypass Lithuania, with which it had strained diplomatic relations. Initially, the idea sparked little interest, but extensive discussions came in 1996, when Boris Yeltsin, President of Russia, declared he would negotiate with the Polish side to seek permission to build a motorway, citing high transit costs via Lithuania.

Top Polish government officials rejected the proposal. Among the main reasons was the fact that among Poles, the proposal sounded too much like the German request for an extraterritorial link through the Polish Corridor just prior to its 1939 invasion of Poland, and was thus seen as unacceptable. This feeling was amplified by the persistent usage of the word "corridor" among Russian officials. Aleksander Kwaśniewski, then-president of Poland, sounded concerns about the environmental impact of the investment, while some politicians from the then-ruling coalition (SLD-PSL) argued that the corridor would cause a deterioration of diplomatic relations between Poland and Lithuania.

There have been reports that Suwałki Voivodeship, the then local authority for the area in Poland, started talks about the corridor to alleviate its economic problems and even signed an agreement with Grodno Region authorities to promote its construction via a border crossing in Lipszczany, but Cezary Cieślukowski, then-voivode of Suwałki who was seen by the media as supportive of the idea, denied having ever endorsed the proposal, and no proof for that (such as plans or cost estimates) was found in an internal party investigation. When GDDKiA, the Polish agency responsible for the maintenance of main roads, updated its plans for the expressway network in 1996, the proposed link was nowhere to be found.

The topic returned in 2001–2002 when Poland and Lithuania were negotiating accession to the European Union. Russian citizens in Kaliningrad were facing the prospect of having to use passports and apply for visas to cross the border of the new EU member states, which sparked outrage in the Russian press. Therefore, Russia suggested that the European Commission grant a right to a 12-hour free transit for the citizens of the oblast through special corridors in Poland and Lithuania, but this proposal was rejected. Another proposal, with sealed trains, also failed to gain traction; it was ultimately agreed to introduce special permits for Russian citizens travelling to/from Kaliningrad Oblast for transit through Lithuania (but not Poland), known as Facilitated Rail Transit Document (FRTD) and a Facilitated Transit Document (FTD) for rail and road trips, respectively.

Kaliningrad Oblast has since been generally supplied by freight trains transiting through Lithuania. However, on 17 June 2022, in retaliation for Russia's invasion of Ukraine, Lithuania started blocking supplies of sanctioned items to the enclave via road or rail, citing EU's sanction guidance. That guidance was then clarified in a way that exempted rail traffic from the restrictions so long as the volume of deliveries remained within prior consumption volumes, but then Šiaulių bankas, the bank servicing the transit payments, announced it would refuse to accept ruble payments from 15 August and any payments from Russian entities from 1 September.

Transit remains possible via payments to other banks but, in September 2022, was expected to become more burdensome as payments for each freight service will be processed separately to comply with Lithuanian anti-fraud regulator's guidance. Another possibility remains for ships to go from St. Petersburg to Kaliningrad, but this route may be unavailable in winter because the more northerly port may freeze.

=== EU economic infrastructure ===
The Suwałki Gap hosts several critical corridors because it is the only land route between the Baltic states and the rest of the European Union and NATO.

A strategic communication artery, known in the international E-road network as E67 or as Via Baltica (expressway S61 on the Polish side and A5 highway on the Lithuanian part), passes through the Suwałki Gap. It is part of the North Sea-Baltic Corridor (previously the Baltic-Adriatic Corridor), one of the core routes of the Trans-European Transport Network (TEN-T) that connects Finland and the Baltic states with the rest of Europe. As of June 2025, the Polish expressway is completed; the only segment not fully open yet is the bypass of Łomża, expected to be unveiled in September 2025. On the Lithuanian side, most of the A5 highway is upgraded to a dual highway with grade-separated junctions. The last section of the motorway, that close to the border is slated to be completed by late 2025.

The Rail Baltica project, currently under construction, will improve the existing connection between the Baltic states and the rest of the European Union by creating a new, unified standard-gauge trunk line running across the Baltic states from Kaunas to Tallinn and eventually underneath the Gulf of Finland to Helsinki. The existing rail connection is only a single-track, non-electrified line that can only go to Kaunas without changing track gauges. This is because Baltic state railways still use the wider Russian gauge, while the vast majority of Polish rolling stock is adapted to the standard gauge common in Western Europe. The Polish sections are expected to be ready by 2028, but as of February 2024 construction work in Poland is already delayed by 3 years and there is no guaranteed funding for the section between Ełk and the Polish-Lithuanian border.

The Gas Interconnection Poland–Lithuania, which opened on 1 May 2022, is the only terrestrial link between the Baltic and Finnish natural gas pipeline system and the rest of the European Union. Its strategic importance was the reason it was recognized as a Project of Common Interest by the EU. The LitPol Link is the route for the only land-based high voltage line between Poland and Lithuania, which was opened in late 2015. Another high-voltage line to Lithuania is yet in the planning stages, as the sea-based Harmony Link (through Klaipėda) was found to be economically unfeasible.

The Suwałki Gap is an important constraint on civilian airspace since the 2022 Russian invasion of Ukraine began. Because of sanctions against Russia and Belarus (in the latter case imposed after Roman Protasevich's airplane was hijacked by the government while over its airspace), aviation from these countries may not fly through the European Union, including to Kaliningrad. However, Russia also banned EU carriers over its territory, and EU airlines were urged not to fly over Belarus. Thus the only feasible way for civilian planes to fly from the Baltic states or Finland southwards is through the Suwałki Gap, or over the Baltic Sea.

Civilian infrastructure crossing the Suwałki Gap

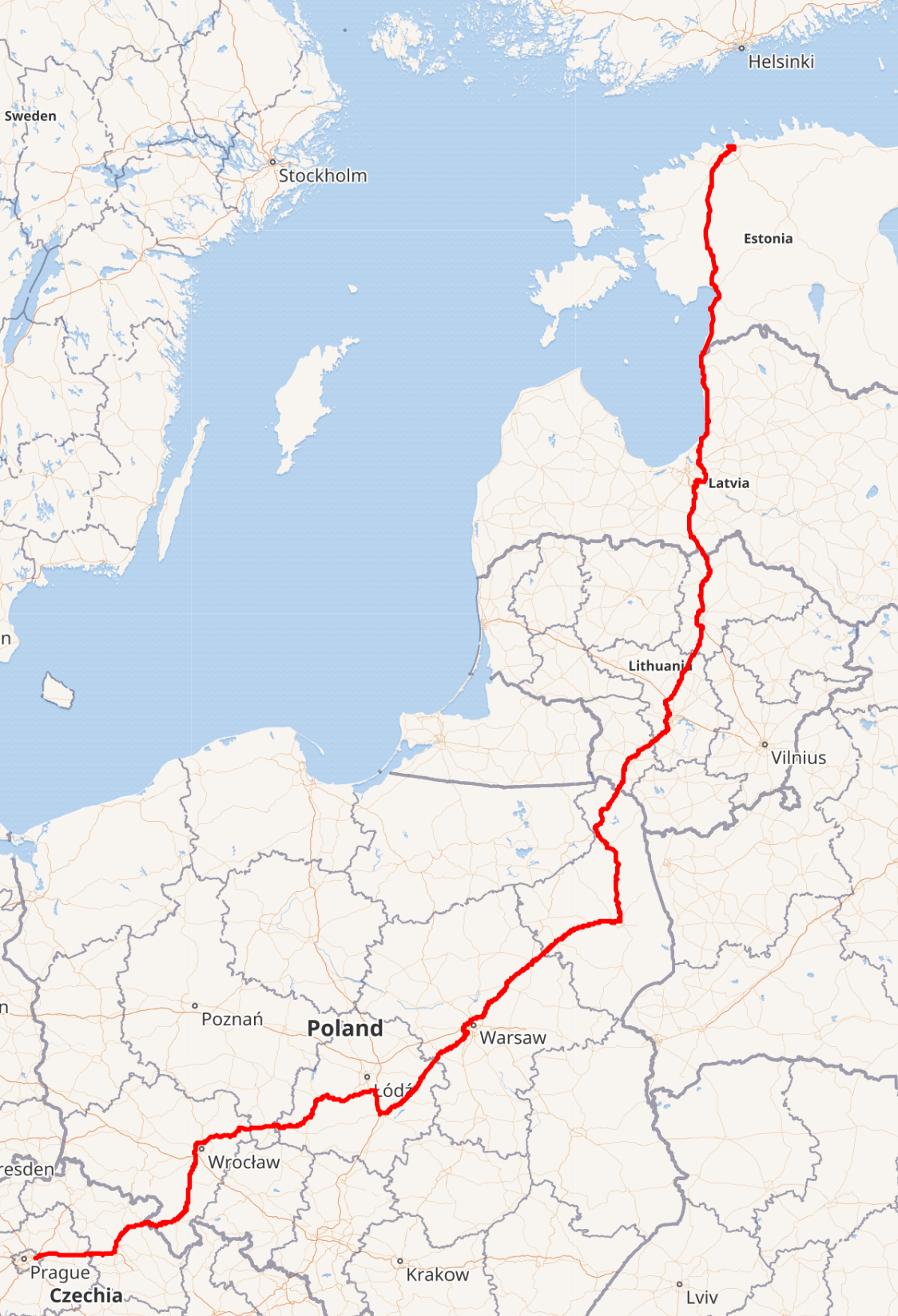
The E67 route, gradually upgraded to expressway standards

Progress on expressway S61 in Poland, leading to the Suwałki Gap, as of April 2024. Green: open. Red: under construction

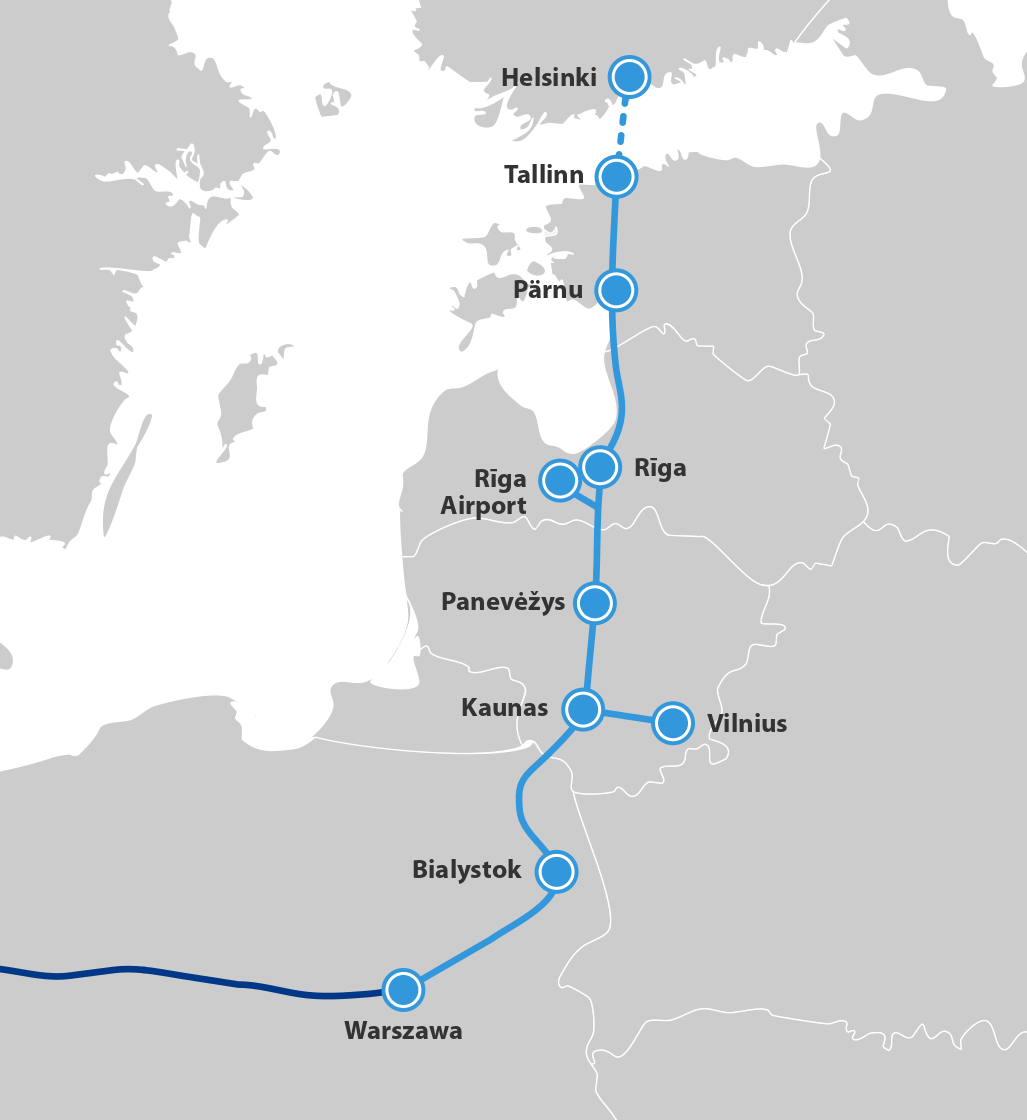
The under-construction Rail Baltica route

The Poland-Lithuania gas interconnection route

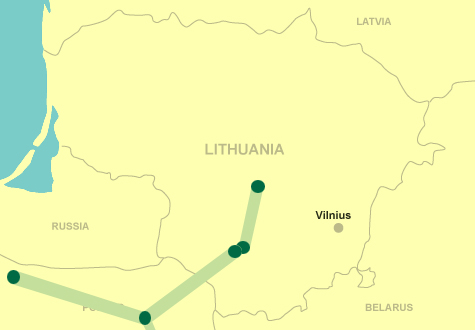
LitPol Link, the high-voltage electricity line connecting Poland and Lithuania

== Military considerations ==
=== History ===
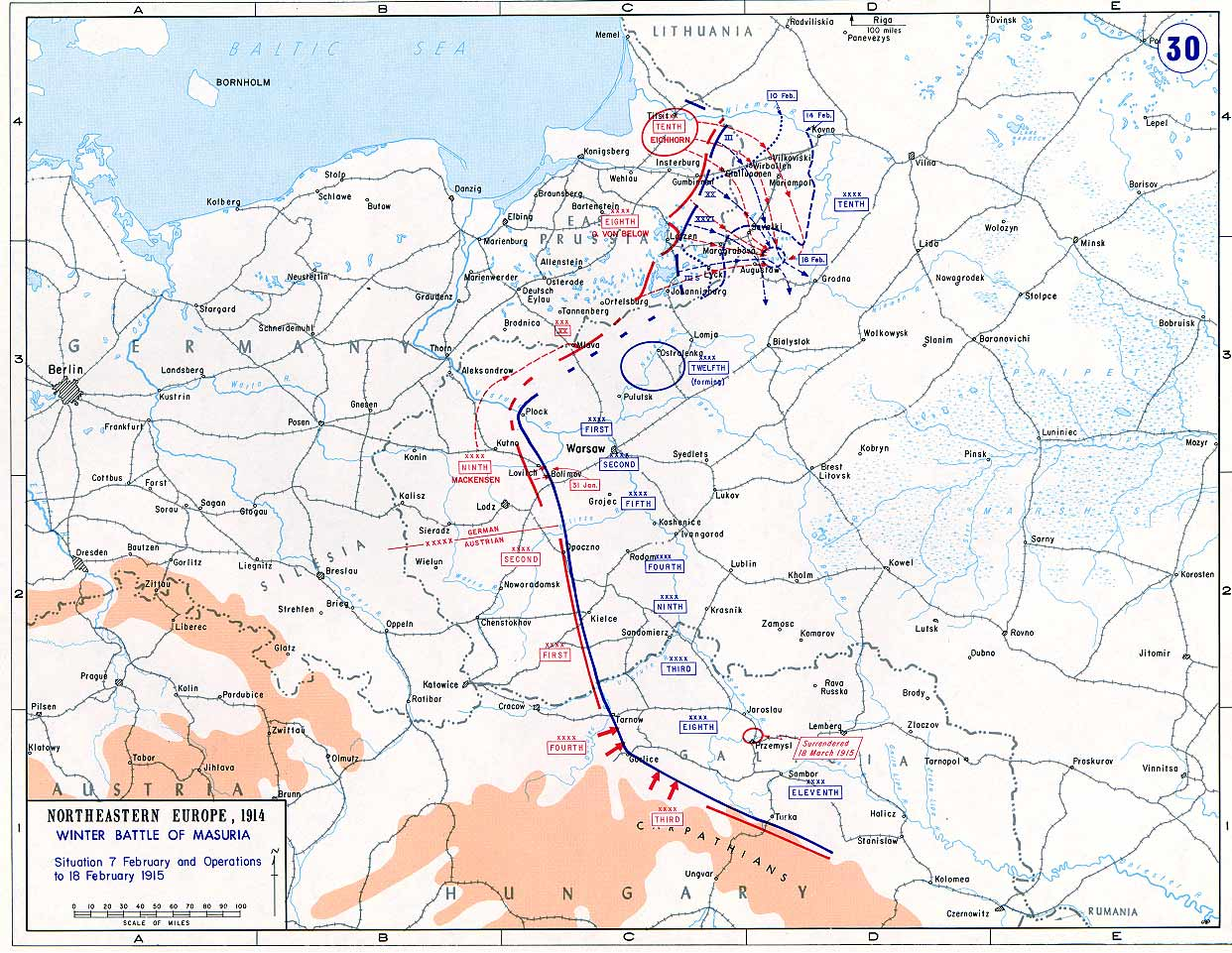
Frontlines on 18 February 1915, during the Second Battle of the Masurian Lakes, waged in the Suwałki Gap area

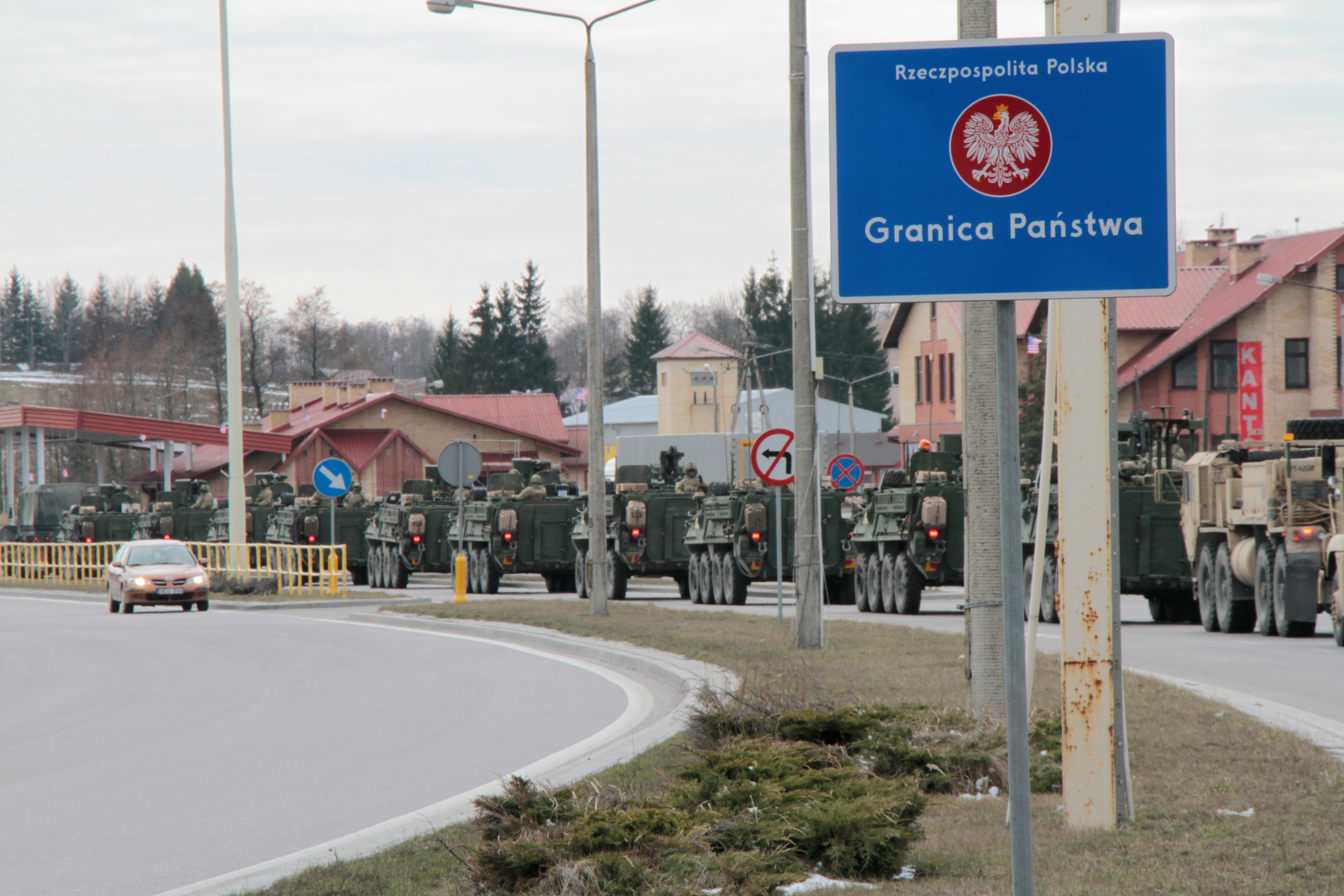
NATO armoured vehicles seen going through the former Budzisko-Kalvarija border crossing into Lithuania as part of Operation Dragoon Ride, 2015

Long before the Suwałki Gap became of concern to NATO, several army battles or operations occurred on the terrain. For example, during Napoleon's war in Russia, part of his army, which crossed into the country from the Duchy of Warsaw, used the Suwałki Gap as a launching pad for the invasion and, by the beginning of 1813, when the remnants of his army retreated, it crossed the gap from Kaunas towards Warsaw. Both battles of the Masurian Lakes during World War I passed or were directly waged on the territory. During the invasion of Poland, which started World War II, most of the action skirted the area, while in 1944, the Red Army simply advanced into East Prussia and no major battle occurred in the area.

Poland and Lithuania joined the North Atlantic Treaty Organization in 1999 and 2004, respectively. On the one hand, this meant that the Kaliningrad exclave was surrounded by NATO states, but on the other, this created a choke point for the military alliance as all troops supplied by land must pass through the Suwałki Gap. In the event of its capture, the Baltic states would be surrounded by Russia, Russian-controlled territories, and Belarus, a Russian ally.

Even if Belarus or Russia are not physically present in the corridor, it is narrow enough for the short-range rockets stationed in either country to target any military supplies coming through the corridor, while alternative routes of delivery, i.e. by sea or air, are also threatened by the anti-air and anti-ship missiles stationed in Kaliningrad Oblast. Due to its strategic importance for NATO and the Baltic states, it has been described as one of NATO's hot spots, its "Achilles' heel" and dubbed the modern version of the Fulda Gap.

Initially, this vulnerability was of relatively little concern as, throughout most of the 1990s, Russia was stuck in a deep depression, which necessitated large-scale cuts to the country's military budget. Even though the army was of significant size, it was poorly equipped and had low military capabilities. Russia–NATO relations were more cordial then, as Russia was not openly hostile to NATO, which was affirmed while signing the 1997 Founding Act, and it was thought that Russia would eventually become a pacifist democracy, decreasing its military and nuclear presence. (Note: The Founding Act is not a ratified treaty and therefore is not legally binding.) NATO's commitment not to build any permanent bases beyond the Oder river therefore seemed reasonable.

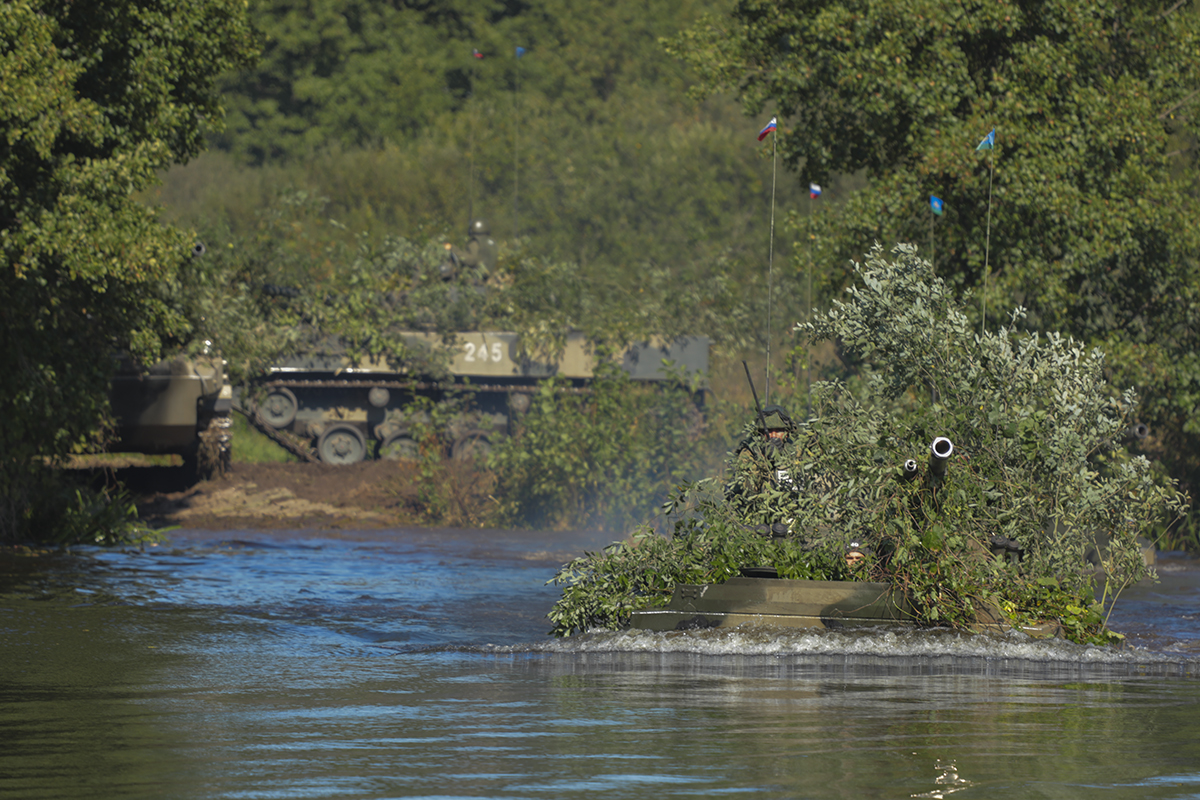
Tanks crossing a water obstacle on the Hozha training ground, Grodno Oblast, Belarus, 30 km (19 mi) from the Suwałki gap, during the 2020 Slavic Brotherhood exercises

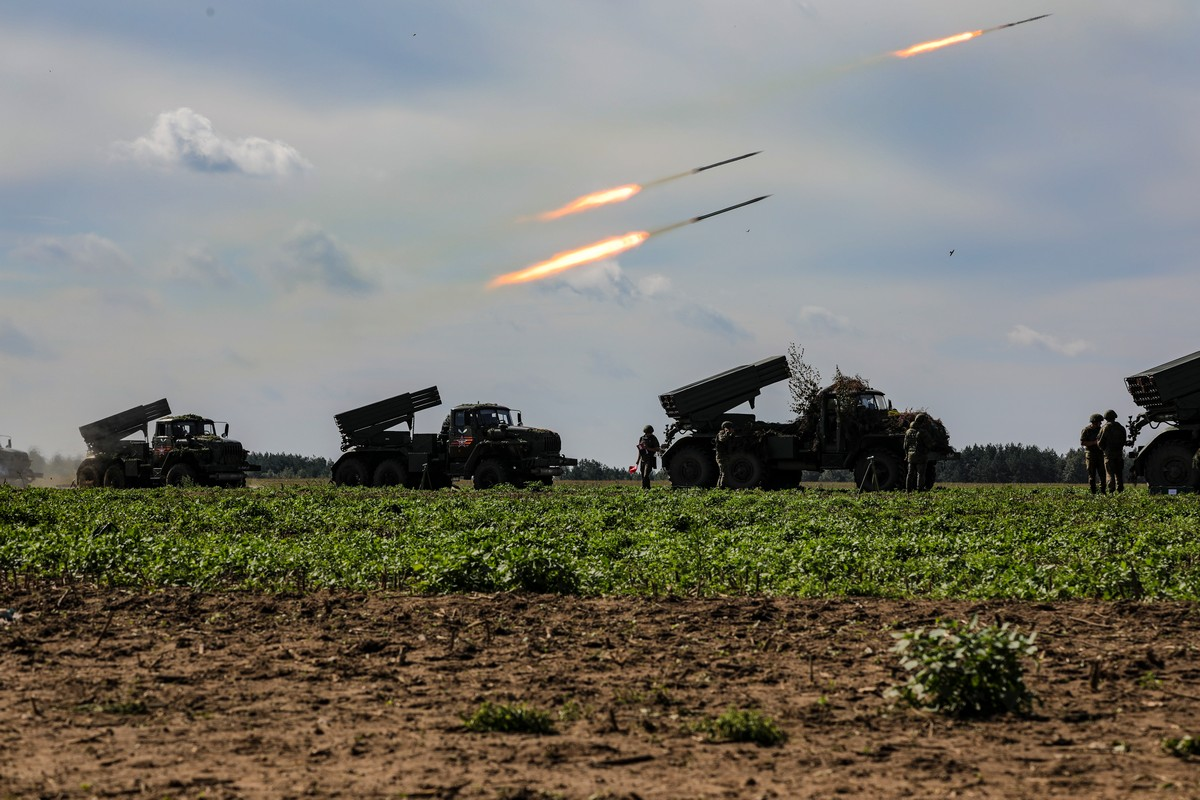
Multiple rocket launchers during Zapad 2021 exercises on the Obuz-Lesnaya military base near Baranavichy, Belarus

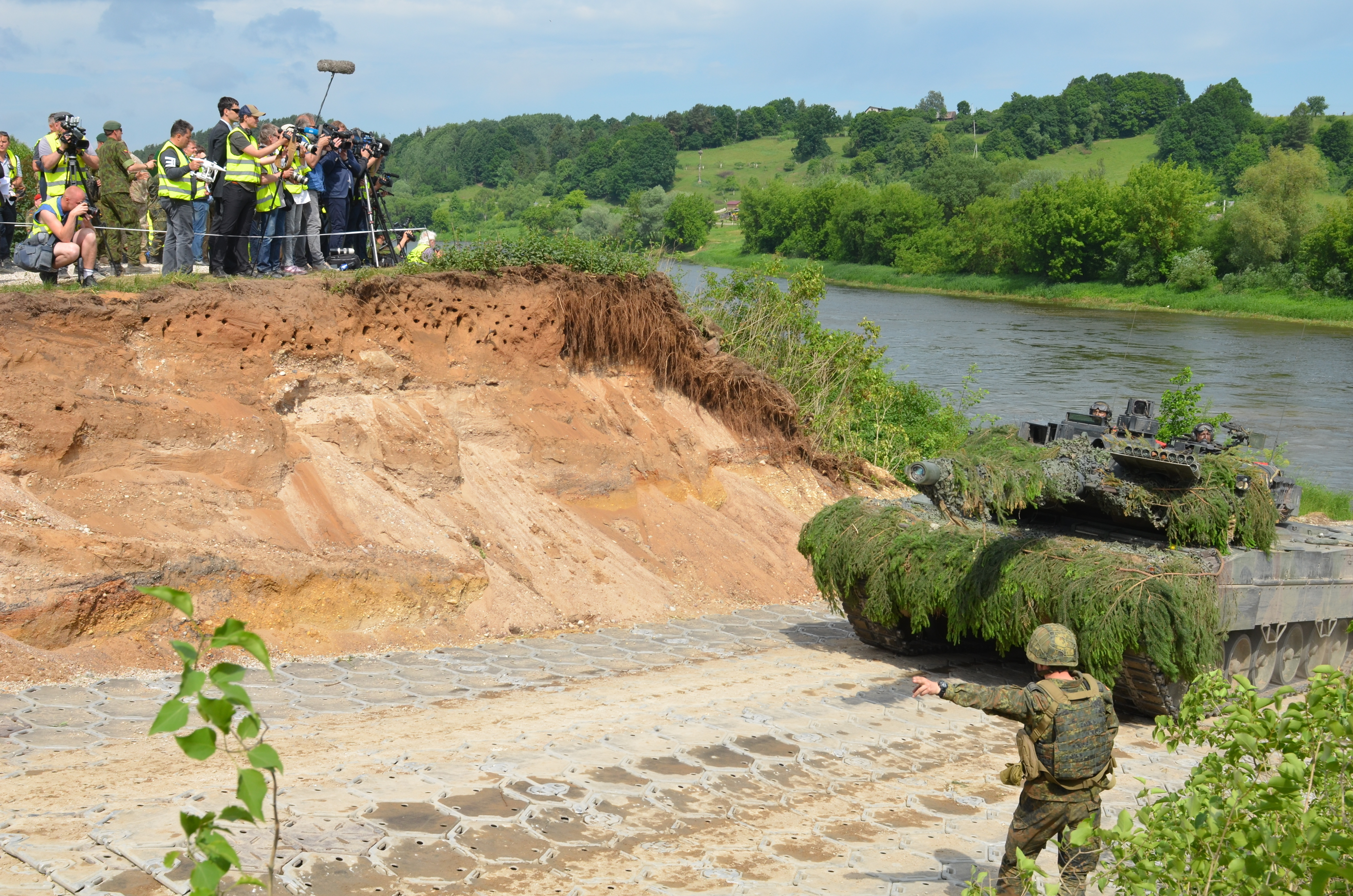
A German Army soldier directs a tank out of water. This activity was part of the 2017 Iron Wolf exercises in Lithuania

==== Escalation of tensions ====
The qualitative and quantitative improvement in armaments started with the rule of Vladimir Putin. Short-range (>500 km [310 mi]) Iskander-M missiles, capable of carrying thermonuclear warheads, were installed in 2018. Additional installations were deployed in the late 2010s, including more area denial weapons, such as K-300P Bastion-P and P-800 Oniks anti-ship missiles and S-400 anti-air missiles.

In general, the importance of the corridor among the Western nations is said to have been initially underestimated due to the fact that Western countries sought to normalise relations with Russia. Most of NATO's activities therefore concentrated on drills and exercises rather than deterrence. The shift in policy occurred gradually after Russia's aggression in Ukraine, which started in 2014. After the 2014 Wales summit and then the 2016 Warsaw summit, NATO members agreed on more military presence in the eastern member states of the Alliance, which came to fruition as the NATO Enhanced Forward Presence. In 2018, the Polish side proposed to station a permanent armoured division in the Bydgoszcz-Toruń area (dubbed "Fort Trump") with up to US$2 billion in financial support, but NATO did not agree to it as it was afraid it would potentially run afoul of the 1997 Founding Act, which, among other things, constrains NATO's ability to build permanent bases next to the Suwałki Gap.

While the permanent military base ultimately did not appear, the military situation around the region has been steadily escalating, and deterrence tactics seem only to have increased the concentration of firepower on both sides. Several military drills, including Zapad 2017, Zapad 2021 and the Union Resolve 2022 exercises in Belarus and Kaliningrad Oblast and others that were unexpected, and NATO's 2017 Iron Wolf exercises in Lithuania as well as some of the annual Operation Saber Strike operations, occurred in areas close to the Suwałki Gap. Around 20,000 soldiers riding 3,500 military vehicles participated in the Dragon 24 NATO drill in Northern Poland.

The Russian forces did not leave Belarus after the 2022 exercises and invaded Ukraine from the north in February and March that year. As the war on NATO's eastern border unraveled, NATO dispatched more troops to its eastern flank, though its representatives said it would not establish permanent presence on its eastern borders. The situation around the area further intensified following Lithuania's declaration on banning the transit of sanctioned goods through its territory. As the security situation rapidly worsened on the east, the Lithuanian and Icelandic ministers of foreign affairs said that Russia had effectively repudiated the 1997 agreement, which was also indirectly suggested by Mircea Geoană, NATO's Deputy Secretary General.

However, by the end of 2023, several assessments found that the threat has become much smaller after the invasion began. They suggested that Russian troops getting bogged down in eastern and southern Ukraine, accession of Sweden and Finland to NATO and a change in the alliance's tactics that saw more troops deployed on NATO's borders meant that Russia was much less likely to start another war.

=== Current standing of forces ===
==== NATO and its member states ====
As of spring 2022, units closest to the Suwałki Gap that belong to NATO or to its member states included:

- 900 German soldiers together with Czech, Norwegian and Dutch troops, totalling about 1,600 personnel, alongside the Mechanised Infantry Brigade Iron Wolf, dispatched in a NATO multinational division in Rukla on the Lithuanian side, 140 km (87 mi) from the border. The brigade is armed with Leopard 2 tanks, Marder infantry fighting vehicles, and PzH-2000 self-propelled howitzers. In June 2023, Defence Minister Boris Pistorius announced that the Germans would increase their presence to 4,000 troops, but the whole brigade is only expected to come in 2027. A €300 million project is going to expand the premises of the military base. A subunit of the Iron Wolf brigade, the Grand Duchess Birutė Mechanized Uhlan Battalion, is stationed in Alytus, 60 km (37 mi) from the Polish-Lithuanian border. Additionally, the military base in Rūdninkai Training Area, which is 35 km (22 mi) south of Vilnius and about 125 km (78 mi) from the Suwałki Gap, was ordered to be reactivated as a matter of urgency after the Seimas passed a bill to that effect. The base was reopened in June 2022 and is capable of holding 3,000 soldiers.
- An American battalion-sized group, 800 people, from the 185th Infantry Regiment, as of mid-2022, together with the Polish 15th Mechanised Brigade, as well as 400 British Royal Dragoons and some Romanian and Croatian troops. These troops are stationed near the Polish towns of Orzysz and Bemowo Piskie, about the same distance from the border as Rukla. The forces are armed with American M1 Abrams and Polish modified T-72 tanks, Stryker, M3 Bradley and Polish BWP-1 infantry fighting vehicles, Croatian M-92 rockets and Romanian air defence systems. Brigades in both countries operate on a rotational basis. The Polish and Lithuanian host brigades signed an agreement for mutual cooperation in 2020, but, unlike with the operations with foreign forces, these are not subordinate to NATO command;
- The 14th Anti-Tank Artillery Regiment, under Polish command, garrisoned in Suwałki and armed with Israeli Spike-LR missiles. The regiment was briefly degraded to a squadron as its equipment was outdated. Some other forces in the area under Polish command include an artillery regiment in Węgorzewo, a mechanised brigade in Giżycko and an anti-air unit in Gołdap.
- Up to 40,000 troops within NATO Response Force, activated on 25 February 2022 following Russia's invasion in Ukraine, which are available on short notice.

In June 2022, Jens Stoltenberg, Secretary General of NATO, pledged more weapons and troops to the Baltic States, seeking to augment NATO's presence to a brigade in each of the Baltic states and Poland (3,000-5,000 troops in each country), while the NATO Response Force will be increased to 300,000 troops.

==== Russia and Belarus ====
Kaliningrad Oblast is a very heavily militarized area subordinate to the command of the Western Military District. Until the 2022 Russian invasion of Ukraine, the Western MD hosted the best equipment and army forces at Russian disposal. In 1997–2010, the whole oblast was organised as a special region under a unified command of all forces dispatched there. Kaliningrad is the headquarters of the Baltic Fleet and the headquarters of the 11th Army Corps (Russian Navy), which has ample air defence capabilities and whose divisions have undergone extensive modernisation in the late 2010s.

According to Konrad Muzyka, who authored a detailed study on the district's forces, the units stationed in Kaliningrad permit medium-intensity combat in the area without support from the Russian mainland. The town of Gusev, in the eastern part of the oblast, just 50 km (31 mi) from the Vištytis tripoint, hosts the 79th Motor Rifle Brigade (BMP-2s and 2S19 Msta self-propelled howitzers) and the 11th Tank Regiment (90 tanks, of which most are T-72B1s at least 23 are the more recent T-72B3s).

Missile units are stationed on the Chernyakhovsk air base (Iskander missile launchers), while the majority of air defence units (Smerch and BM-27 Uragan multiple rocket launchers) are located in the vicinity of Kaliningrad. Kaliningrad also hosts capabilities to conduct electronic warfare, in which the Russian forces have both inherited much experience from the Soviet times and earned it during hybrid warfare operations such as in Donbas.

Russia has not officially confirmed whether it has nuclear warheads in the exclave, but Iskander missiles are known to be capable of carrying such weapons. In 2018, the Federation of American Scientists published photos showing a weapons storage facility northwest of Kaliningrad being upgraded in a way that enables nuclear weapons storage. In addition to that, Arvydas Anušauskas, the Lithuanian minister of defence, claimed that Russia already has these in the exclave.

Belarus's military command, while formally independent as a military command of a sovereign state, has organisationally aligned itself with the Russian command and is in many respects wholly or substantially dependent on Russian defence institutions and contractors, while persistent underinvestment in its own military and deepening ties with its eastern neighbour left the military with low offensive capabilities, with the only feasible role being that of support of the main Russian forces. For instance, the countries share the air defence system, including its command.

There are relatively few units on the Belarusian side - the headquarters of the Western Operational Command (one of the two in Belarus) as well as the 6th Mechanised Brigade is in Grodno (S-300 anti-air missiles), while air operations may be conducted from the military air base in Lida. They have received some Russian reinforcements ahead of Zapad-2021 exercises, including more S-300 missiles in Grodno, and in early 2022, when S-400 missiles were installed in Gomel Region. In May 2022, Alexander Lukashenko announced that he had bought Iskanders and S-400 missiles from the Russians.

=== Strategy ===
==== Attack ====
There is broad consensus among Western military think tanks that any hypothetical attack on NATO would involve an attempt to capture the Suwałki Gap and therefore to surround the Baltic states. The reasons for the hypothetical attack are seen not to be primarily the occupation of the three former Soviet republics by Russia but to sow distrust in NATO's capabilities, to discredit the military alliance and to assert Russia's position as one of the major military powers. A possible scenario for such a move was voiced by Igor Korotchenko, a retired Russian colonel and state TV pundit, who suggested that the Russians could take over the Suwałki Gap as well as the Swedish island of Gotland while jamming NATO's radio signals, in order to establish effective military control over all possible supply routes to the Baltic states. Another summary was presented by Franz-Stefan Gady of the International Institute for Strategic Studies, where he suggested that Russia would capture the Suwałki Gap and then force NATO to back down using the threat of deploying nuclear weapons.

Despite being shorter, the Polish side of the Suwałki Gap is unlikely to be used as the area of main concentration of these forces, according to these experts. A 2019 Russian paper indicated that the potential attack cutting off the Baltic states from NATO could be held north of the Suwałki Gap, in south-western Lithuania, due to better efficiencies for the Russian forces; the same route was assumed in Zapad 2017 and Zapad 2021 military exercises. This is also an area of attack deemed more favourable by the Center for European Policy Analysis (CEPA) and the Swedish Defence Research Agency (FOI) papers, as the terrain is flatter and less forested and thus easier for heavier troops. Faustyna Klocek was one of the few proposing that the attack would lie over Polish territory.

Some analysts suggest another theory, namely that the importance of the Suwałki Gap is overblown. CNA's Michael Kofman compared the Suwałki Gap's to a "MacGuffin" (by itself unimportant but what he argues could be part of a frontline stretching for hundreds of kilometres) and arguing that previous analyses, which were necessarily limited, relied on a simplified view of the Russian military and did not sufficiently analyse its doctrine as a whole. Franz-Stefan Gady, on the other hand, opined that if Russia's goal were to present a fait accompli situation, it would be easier for Russia to capture any Baltic state rather than specifically the Suwałki Gap because the Russians would have to defend it against Poles and possibly Germans instead of the small armies of the Baltic states. Alexander Lanoszka of Chatham House says that Russia has no interest in closing the gap, as the transit agreements are already good enough and invading NATO would create as many problems for Russia as NATO would have. Fredrik Westerlund (FOI) had a similar point of view.

During the migrant crisis on the eastern border of NATO and EU, there were concerns voiced by NATO and Ukrainian intelligence officials that Belarus would send migrants to the Suwałki Gap in order to destabilise the area, which in turn would give a pretext for Russia to introduce "peacekeeping" troops. The Polish government's fear that Russia could potentially open up a migrant route via Kaliningrad Oblast culminated in a decision to build a fence on the border with the exclave, similar to the one Poland erected on the Belarusian border the previous year. To some extent, these fears were justified after the Wagner Group aborted the rebellion in Russia and was thus exiled to Belarus. The mercenaries started training Belarusian soldiers in close proximity to the Polish border near the vulnerable area, which prompted the Polish Armed Forces to close some of the border crossings and send 10,000 reinforcement troops.

Some of the initial assessments were grim about the prospect of the Baltic states. In 2016, the RAND Corporation ran simulations that suggested that with the NATO forces available at the time and despite less military presence in the area than in the Soviet times, an unexpected attack would have Russian troops enter or approach Riga and Tallinn in 36–60 hours from the moment of the invasion. The think tank attributed the swift advance to the tactical advantage in the region, easier logistics for Russian troops, better maneuverability and an advantage in heavy equipment on Russia's side. In general, the Russian Armed Forces, according to NATO's expectations, will try to overwhelm the Baltic states, cut off its only land route to the rest of NATO and force a fait accompli situation before the Alliance's reinforcements are able to come by land (air reinforcements are much more expensive and are vulnerable to surface-to-air strikes), only to face a dilemma between surrendering the area to the invader and directly confronting Russian troops, potentially escalating the war to a nuclear conflict.

Ben Hodges, a retired US Army general who served as a high-ranking NATO commander and who co-authored a paper published by the CEPA on the defence of the Suwałki Gap, said in 2018 that the Suwałki Gap was an area where "many (of) NATO's [...] weaknesses converge[d]". Following major setbacks in the Russian invasion of Ukraine, Hodges revised his opinion towards a more positive tone, saying that NATO was much better prepared and could hold control over the area in case of an attack, particularly since Sweden and Finland would, in his opinion, likely help NATO despite at the time not being members of the alliance. An Estonian MP estimated that Finland's membership in NATO, for which the accession protocol was signed in 2022, would make the security situation of the Baltic states more tenable thanks to an alternative corridor lying through the waters of the Gulf of Finland, which could be enforced using the relatively robust Finnish Navy. It was also suggested that Swedish accession to NATO would finally grant NATO some strategic depth in the area and otherwise facilitate the defence of the Baltic states.

There appears to be strong support for Russia's invasion of the area among the Russians. A March 2022 survey by a Ukrainian pollster, which was concealing its identity while soliciting answers and which was asking questions using the Russian government-preferred rhetoric, reported that a large majority of Russians could support an invasion of another country should the "special military operation", as Russia officially calls the invasion of Ukraine, succeed, and that the most support for that invasion (three-quarters of those who did not abstain from an answer, and almost half of all respondents) would be against Poland, followed by the Baltic states.

==== Defence ====
While the Suwałki Gap is a choke point, military analysts suggest that the fact that the region has abundant thick forests, streams and lakes means that the landscape facilitates defence against an invading force. Additionally, the soil in the area makes it very hard to operate under rainy conditions as off-road areas or roads without a hard surface become impassable mud. The Center for European Policy Analysis paper points out that the hilly and more forested terrain of the Polish part of the Suwałki Gap favours actions on the defensive side, such as ambushes and holding entrenched positions; at the same time, low density of roads that are largely not designed for carrying heavy cargo means that the few that remain available for the military may be easily blocked.

The natural defences largely eliminate the need for additional military fortifications, and some of them, such as the one in Bakałarzewo, have been converted to private museums. On the other hand, this also means that once Russia is in possession of the corridor, which could happen if NATO reinforcements arrive late, it will be very hard to eject the Russians from the area. These reports say that the conditions are unfavourable for heavy equipment, particularly in bad weather, though John R. Deni of the Strategic Studies Institute argued the terrain was generally fine for a tank offensive.

The current Polish military doctrine under Mariusz Błaszczak, the Minister of National Defence (MoD), is to concentrate the units close to the Russian and Belarusian borders in order to wage a defensive campaign in a similar way to the one Poland was conducting in September 1939. There were two war games made to verify the scenario. In the first one, made in 2019, the US Marine Corps War College modelled a hypothetical scenario of World War III. The other one, codenamed Zima-20, was conducted by the Polish War Studies Academy on MoD's request in 2020. Most of its assumptions remain confidential, but it is known that they include units with yet-to-be-delivered upgraded equipment that try to endure 22 days of defence against an invading force and, similarly to the American model, the military activities start in the Suwałki Gap and Poland tries to defend Eastern Poland at all cost.

Both results were catastrophic: in the American simulation, Polish units would incur about 60,000 casualties in the first day of war, and NATO and Russia would fare a battle that would prove very bloody to both sides, losing about half of the participating forces within 72 hours. Zima-20's results, which are interpreted with some dose of caution, showed that by day 4 of the invasion, the Russians already advanced to the Vistula river and fighting in Warsaw was underway, while by day 5, the Polish ports were rendered unusable for reinforcements or occupied, the Navy and the Air Force were obliterated despite NATO's assistance, while the Polish units dispatched close to the border could lose as much as 60-80% of personnel and materiel. (Note: The government officials initially did not comment on the revelations of the secret war game, though Błaszczak later denied that the exercises were unsuccessful and said that the Polish Armed Forces were capable of withholding a potential offensive.)

Very few locals are expected to endorse an invasion, in contrast to what happened in Crimea in 2014, as the influence of the Russians in the area is not significant; that said, Daniel Michalski's survey found that the region's local population is inadequately prepared for a hypothetical military conflict and that the area has next to no civilians immediately ready to engage in combat. Regional tensions are such that some tourists are afraid to go there, though Andrzej Sęk and retired Col. Kazimierz Kuczyński say that such fears are likely unfounded as Russia's resources are being expended in Ukraine. Additionally, the Russians may want to use the historic tensions between Poland and Lithuania to set them against each other.

===== Proposed solutions =====
NATO's military doctrine assumes that its member states would have to hold the invasion for as long as NATO needs to send reinforcements to the attacked states, and in the meantime, NATO would operate on the terrain using tripwire forces dispatched in the area. There is no consensus about the right kind of forces and their mode of deployment near the Suwałki Gap that would best fit the doctrine, though the predominant thought goes that at least some forces or money to improve infrastructure should be sent to Poland.

Among the analysts that took into account the Suwałki Gap vulnerability in their reports or opinion pieces, the majority argued that some form of permanent U.S. military presence in Poland should exist, and most of the reports agreed that the NATO (or American) units should be as mobile as practically possible. The Warsaw Institute argued that while it would be costly to maintain, the military base proposed by Poland in 2018 would be an effective deterrent for Russia and would ensure quick dispatches of U.S. forces to the Suwałki Gap if needed.

Hunzeker and Lanoszka say that fears over the bottleneck are exaggerated, as are fears over Russian war against NATO, and they conclude that nothing should constrain the Alliance from attacking Kaliningrad Oblast or Belarus if the latter engages in the conflict, too. They advocate for a permanent presence of U.S. military but with units dispersed all over Poland instead of one big military base, and crafted in a way that avoids as much Russian rebuke as possible. Lanoszka separately suggests troops dispatched to Russian-minority areas in Estonia and Latvia instead, as he believes Russia is more likely to make a limited incursion on these areas. Another report, by the Strategic Studies Institute (SSI), also suggested a permanent presence of one brigade of NATO troops in each of the Baltic states.

Hodges et al., writing for CEPA, in principle supported an increased permanent presence of U.S. forces (including a divisional headquarters) but also said that NATO forces must be more mobile so that Russian troops have no chance to avoid the tripwire units. The report also recommended that more effort should be put into improving transport capabilities and reducing red tape between NATO's member states, noting that defending the Suwałki Gap is a much different challenge from that of the Cold War-era Fulda Gap. John R. Deni of the SSI echoed CEPA paper's arguments and argued that since Russia deployed a large contingent of Russian troops together with modern arms in Belarus just prior to the beginning of the full-scale Russian invasion of Ukraine, NATO should disregard the 1997 Founding Act and start a dramatic increase of armaments and troop numbers near the Suwałki Gap and in the Baltic states.

Some experts argued the opposite, i.e. that increased NATO presence may be detrimental for NATO. Nikolai Sokov of the James Martin Center for Nonproliferation Studies, writing for the conservative outlet The National Interest, criticised the recommendations for ramping up military presence, arguing that Russia and NATO should learn to live with their own vulnerabilities in order to prevent an arms race. Some people, including Dmitri Trenin of Carnegie Moscow Center, said this had already been happening due to NATO's increased presence in the area.

James J. Coyle of the Atlantic Council similarly argued that the West should not escalate by sending more troops to the immediate vicinity of the Suwałki Gap, but instead rely on efficient logistics in case of war. Viljar Veebel and Zdzisław Śliwa, on the other hand, proposed that NATO should either deploy as many troops as it can while not paying attention to Russia's complaints about that or attempt to convince them (by escalating elsewhere, for example) not to reinforce their troops near the Suwałki Gap using means other than deterrence.

== See also ==
- Russia–NATO relations
- Salient (military)
- Suwałki Region
- Orenburg corridor
- Siliguri Corridor

Other NATO vulnerabilities:

- Focșani Gate
- GIUK gap
- Fulda Gap
