= Jerzy Leszczyński (chemist) =

Polish American Computational Chemistry (born 1949)

Jerzy Leszczyński Professor & Presidential Distinguished Fellow
- Born: 26 May 1949 (age 77); Tomaszów Lubelski, Poland
- Occupation: Chemist
- Title: Emeritus Professor of Computational Chemistry
- Awards: The United States Presidential Award for Excellence in Science, Mathematics, and Engineering Mentoring; The Maria Skłodowska-Curie Medal

Academic background
- Education: Technical University of Wrocław; Jackson State University
- Thesis: Application of molecular orbital theory to the calculation of energy levels for compounds with M3O+N and M2M'O+N cores(PhD) (1975)
- Doctoral advisor: Walter Wojciechowski

Academic work
- Discipline: Chemistry
- Sub-discipline: quantum computational chemistry
- Institutions: Wroclaw University of Science and Technology; Jackson State University
- Website: Home page www.researchgate.net/profile/Jerzy-Leszczynski

Jerzy Leszczyński (born 26 May 1949 in Tomaszów Lubelski, Poland) is a Polish-American theoretical and computational chemist. He is Professor of Chemistry and President's Distinguished Fellow at Jackson State University in Jackson, Mississippi, United States. His research focuses on computational quantum chemistry, molecular modeling, nanoscience, and the application of theoretical methods to biological systems and nanomaterials.

== Early life and education ==
Jerzy Leszczyński was a pupil at the First General Secondary School in Zamość from 1963 to 1967. His chemistry teacher was Teofill Lawgmin. After graduating from high school in 1967, he began his studies at the Faculty of Chemistry at the Wrocław University of Technology.

Leszczynski received both his M.Sc. (1972) and Ph.D. (1975) degrees from the Technical University of Wrocław (now Wrocław University of Science and Technology), Poland.

== Academic career ==
His scientific work has included studies of the electronic structure and properties of DNA fragments, molecular interactions in biologically important systems, and computational investigations of the physicochemical properties and toxicity of nanomaterials. He has authored or co-authored of over 1,000 scientific publications and numerous book chapters. His research has been widely cited in the fields of computational chemistry and nanoscience. In addition to his research activities, Leszczyński has served as editor or editorial board member of several scientific journals and has edited numerous books and reference works in computational chemistry.

Leszczyński's work is regarded as bridging theoretical chemistry with applications in molecular biology, materials science, and nanotechnology, reflecting the growing role of computational methods in modern chemical research.

Throughout his career, Leszczyński supervised more than thirty Ph.D. students, many of whom have continued careers in academia, industry, and government research.

== Contributions ==
Jerzy Leszczynski's research has focused on the development and application of computational quantum chemistry to problems in chemistry, biology, and materials science. His work spans electronic structure theory, molecular modeling, nanoscience, and computational toxicology.

One of his principal research areas has been the theoretical investigation of nucleic acids and biologically important molecular systems. Using quantum-chemical methods, his group studied the electronic structure, stability, and intermolecular interactions of DNA fragments and related biomolecules, contributing to a better understanding of molecular recognition and biological processes at the atomic level.

A second major direction of his research concerns nanomaterials and nanotoxicology. Leszczynski was among the researchers who promoted the application of computational chemistry to predicting the physicochemical properties, biological activity, and potential toxicity of engineered nanomaterials. His work has contributed to the development of computational approaches supporting the safe design of nanomaterials and has helped establish computational nanoscience as an interdisciplinary research field.

Beyond his own research, Leszczyński has played an important role in building the international computational chemistry community. Since 1992 he has chaired the Current Trends in Computational Chemistry conference series, and since 2001 he has organized the Southern Schools on Computational Chemistry and Materials Sciences, both of which have served as international forums for scientific collaboration and the training of young researchers.

Leszczyński has also made substantial contributions as an editor of scientific books and journals. Through numerous edited volumes and editorial activities, he has helped disseminate advances in computational chemistry and foster international collaboration within the discipline. He has held visiting and honorary academic appointments at institutions in Europe and Asia and has received several international distinctions for his contributions to chemistry, scientific mentoring, and research collaboration

He is the author of a study on the emigration of chemists from Poland.

== Honors ==
His honors include election to the European Academy of Sciences, the Maria Skłodowska-Curie Medal of the Polish Chemical Society, the United States Presidential Award for Excellence in Science, Mathematics, and Engineering Mentoring (2009 PAESMEM recipient)., and honorary doctorates and professorships awarded by several universities. He was nominate as honorary consulate of Politechnika Wrocławska in 2018
