= Sielc, Podlaskie Voivodeship =

Sielc
- Village
- Location within Poland
- Coordinates: 52°38′N 22°54′E
- Country: Poland
- Voivodeship: Podlaskie
- County: Bielsk
- Gmina: Boćki

Sielc [ɕɛlt͡s] is a village in the administrative district of Gmina Boćki, within Bielsk County, Podlaskie Voivodeship, in north-eastern Poland.
