= Białystok School of Public Administration =

Non-State Higher School of Pedagogy
- Niepaństwowa Wyższa Szkoła Pedagogiczna
- Type: Private
- Active: 1996–2019
- Students: 4245 (as of 2004/2005)
- Address: 15-555 Suchowolca 6, Białystok, Poland; 53°06′31″N 23°12′32″E
- Website: wsap.edu.pl

The Białystok School of Public Administration was a non-state higher education institution founded in 1996 as an initiative of the Foundation in Support of Local Democracy. It was a non-state and non-profit school of higher education.

The school's rector was Barbara Kudrycka. The school was closed in 2019.

== Location ==
Rectorate of the Białystok School of Public Administration located at the former Rüdiger Palace built in mid 19th century, known also as the Lubomirski Palace

== Courses of study ==
- Public administration
- Cultural Studies
- International Relations
- Philosophy
- Public Health Management
- Spatial Economy
- Pedagogy
- Homeland security
