= Cezary Cieślukowski =

Polish politician (born 1962)

Chairman of the Podlaskie Voivodeship Sejmik
- Incumbent
- Assumed office 7 May 2024
- Preceded by: Bogusław Dębski

Voivode of the Suwałki Voivodeship
- In office 1992–1997
- Preceded by: Andrzej Podchul
- Succeeded by: Paweł Podczaski

Personal details
- Born: 22 February 1962 (age 64) Suwałki, Polish People's Republic
- Citizenship: Poland
- Party: Third Way (since 2023)
- Other political affiliations: Freedom Union; Civic Platform; Polish People's Party
- Education: SGH Warsaw School of Economics
- Occupation: Economist, politician
- Awards: Medal for Merit in Fire Protection

Cezary Cieślukowski (February 22, 1962 in Suwałki) is a Polish politician, local government official and manager. In the years 1992–1997, Voivode of Suwałki Voivodeship, member of the executive board of the Podlaskie Voivodeship (2011–2013), in 2015 undersecretary of state in the Ministry of Health and from 2024 he is the chairman of the Podlaskie Voivodeship Sejmik.

== Biography ==
He graduated in economics from the Central School of Planning and Statistics. He worked as a commissioner of the city of Sejny, then held the position of director of the office of the local government assembly. In the period 1992–1997 he held the office of Voivode of Suwałki Voivodeship.

After leaving government administration, he started running a business as president of the board of the Wigry-Projekt joint-stock company. He took up the position of chairman of the Euroregion Niemen Convention, as well as vice-president of the Podlaskie Football Association.

He was a member of the Freedom Union, and in 2001 he became an activist in the Civic Platform, managing its local structures in Suwałki. In 1998 he was elected a councilor of the Podlaskie Voivodeship Assembly, which he held for two consecutive terms. In 2001 he ran unsuccessfully for the Sejm from the Civic Platform list, and in 2004 election to the European Parliament. In 2007 he unsuccessfully ran for re-election to the Podlaskie Voivodeship Sejmik in early elections, but in the 2010 election he was re-elected. In 2011 he was appointed a member of the regional board, a position he held until 2013. In September 2014 election, after he was not placed on the Civic Platform list for the regional assembly again, he left the party and joined the Polish People's Party. In the same year, he was re-elected on the Polish People's Party ticket in the regional elections. In February 2015, he was nominated by Prime Minister Ewa Kopacz for the position of undersecretary of state in the Ministry of Health. In October 2015, he ran in the parliamentary elections to the Sejm from the Polish People's Party list, and in November of that year he was dismissed from the position of deputy minister. In 2018, he was re-elected as a councilor of the Podlaskie Voivodeship Sejmik. In December 2018, he took the position of deputy chairman of the Podlaskie Voivodeship Sejmik, from which he was dismissed in February 2019. In the same year, he unsuccessfully ran for the Sejm on behalf of the Polish People's Party. In February 2021, he again became deputy chairman of the Podlaskie Voivodeship Sejmik. In the 2023 elections, he ran for the senator's seat from the Third Way list.

In 2024, he retained his mandate as a provincial councilor for another term, and in May of that year he was elected chairman of the Podlaskie Voivodeship Sejmik.
