= Boratyńszczyzna =

- Village
- Location within Poland
- Coordinates: 53°17′41″N 23°36′2″E
- Country: Poland
- Voivodeship: Podlaskie
- County: Sokółka
- Gmina: Szudziałowo
- Population: 55

Boratyńszczyzna [bɔratɨɲʂˈt͡ʂɨzna] is a village in the administrative district of Gmina Szudziałowo, within Sokółka County, Podlaskie Voivodeship, in north-eastern Poland, close to the border with Belarus.
