= Podlaskie Voivodeship Sejmik =

Podlaskie Voivodeship Sejmik Polish: Sejmik Województwa Podlaskiego

Type
- Type: Unicameral
- Houses: Regional Assembly (sejmik wojewódzki)

Leadership
- Chairperson: Cezary Cieślukowski, TD
- Vice-Chairpersons: Jarosław Dworzański Łukasz Nazarenko
- Marshal: Łukasz Prokorym, PO

Structure
- Seats: 30 councilors (Polish: radnych)
- Political groups: Executive board (17): KO (8); PO (7); Independent (1); PSL (5); Independent (3); P2050 (1); Opposition (13): PiS (12); PiS (10); SP (1); PR (1); KiBS (1); P (1)

Elections
- Last election: 7 April 2024

Meeting place
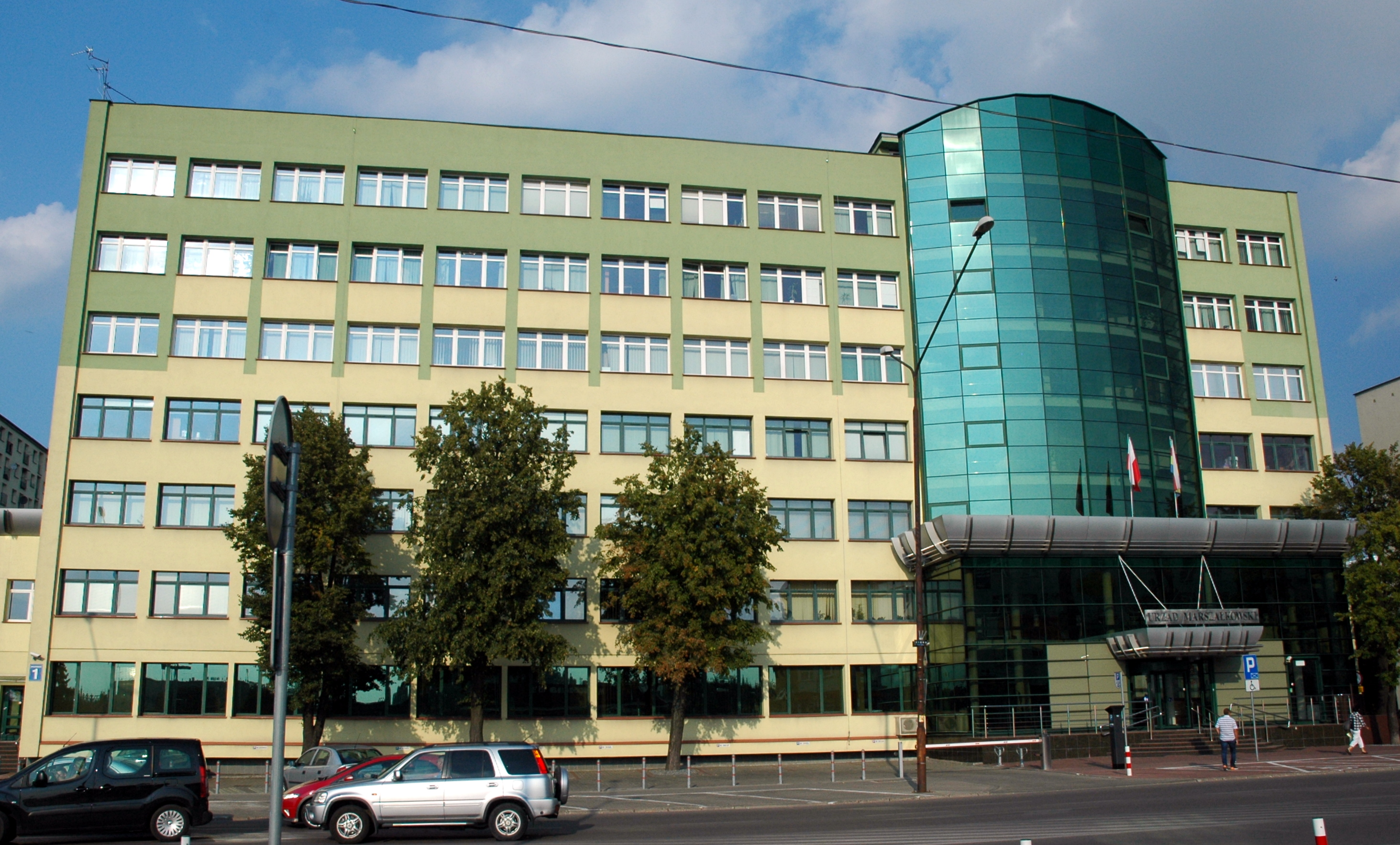
- 1 Kardynała Stefana Wyszyńskiego, Białystok

Website
- Podlaskie Regional Assembly

The Podlaskie Voivodeship Sejmik (Polish: Sejmik Województwa Podlaskiego) is the regional legislature of the Voivodeship of Podlaskie. It is a unicameral parliamentary body consisting of thirty councillors elected to a five-year term. The current chairperson of the assembly is Cezary Cieślukowski.

The assembly elects the executive board that acts as the collective executive for the regional government, headed by the province's marshal. The current Executive Board of Podlaskie is held by the coalition government of Civic Coalition and Third Way and supported by two PiS members with Łukasz Prokorym, KO presiding as marshal. The Regional Assembly meets in the Marshal's Office in Białystok.

== Districts ==
Members of the Assembly are elected from five districts, serve five-year terms. The districts do not have formal names, instead each constituency has a number and territorial description.

Number	Seats	City counties	Land counties
1	7	Białystok	None
2	5	Suwałki	Augustów, Sejny, Suwałki
3	5	Łomża	Grajewo, Kolno, Łomża
4	5	None	Bielsk, Siemiatycze, Wysokie Mazowieckie, Zambrów
5	8	None	Białystok, Hajnówka, Mońki, Sokółka

== See also ==
- Polish Regional Assembly
- Podlaskie Voivodeship
