= Consular passport =

Consular passport may refer to:

- Consular passport (Paraguay)
- Consular passport (Poland)
- Consular passport (United States), see File:1941 US consular passport issued at Shanghai by Consul General Frank P. Lockhart.jpg
