= Karta Polaka =

Polish document confirming belonging to Polish nation

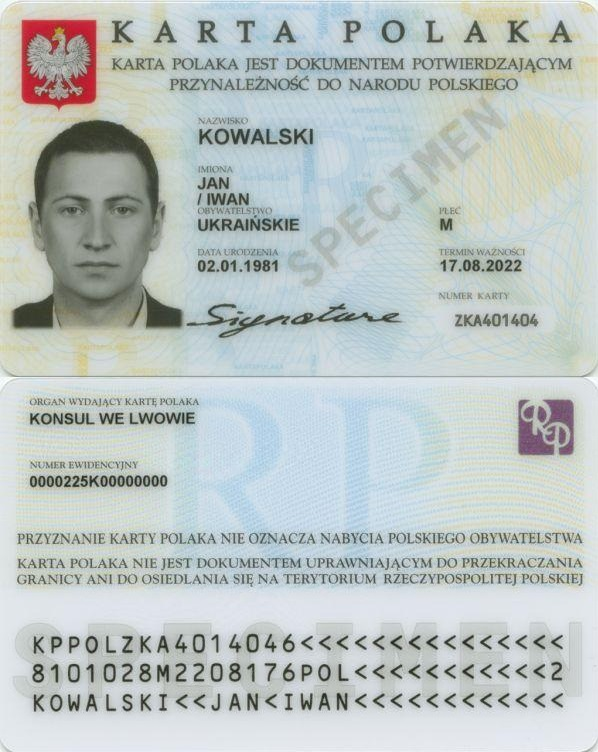
Karta Polaka – specimen document

Karta Polaka ([ˈkarta pɔˈlaka] lit. Pole's Card, also translated as Polish Card), is a document confirming belonging to the Polish nation, which may be given to individuals who cannot obtain dual citizenship in their own countries while belonging to the Polish nation according to conditions defined by law; and, who do not have prior Polish citizenship or permission to reside in Poland. It was established by an act of the Polish parliament dated 7 September 2007 called the Act on the Pole's Card (Ustawa o Karcie Polaka, Dz.U. 2007 no. 180/1280), which specifies the rights of the holder of the Card, the rules for granting, loss of validity and rescission of the Card, and the competencies of the public administration's bodies and procedures in these cases. The law came into force on 29 March 2008.

== Conditions for granting ==
Initially, the Card could be granted to people who do not have Polish citizenship or permission to reside in Poland and who are citizens of the former Soviet Union states: Armenia, Azerbaijan, Belarus, Estonia, Georgia, Kazakhstan, Kyrgyzstan, Lithuania, Latvia, Moldova, Russia, Tajikistan, Turkmenistan, Ukraine and Uzbekistan. Since 2019, the Card can be granted to citizens of all states (excluding Poland).

States whose citizens of Polish origin could apply for the Karta Polaka (red). Since 2019, citizens of all states (except Poland) can apply.

The Card can be granted to a person who declares belonging to "the Polish Nation" and meets the following conditions:

- proves his/her relationship with Polishness by at least a basic knowledge of the Polish language, which is considered their native language, along with knowledge and cultivating Polish traditions and habits;
- in the presence of the consul of the Republic of Poland or an authorized employee of a Polish organisation submits a written declaration of belonging to "the Polish Nation";
- proves that at least one of his/her parents or grandparents or two great-grandparents were of Polish nationality or had Polish citizenship, or present an attestation from a Polish or Polish diaspora organization acting on the territory of one of the above-mentioned states, confirming that he or she has been actively involved in Polish linguistic and cultural activities within Polish community of their region for a period of at least the past three years.

Those who have confirmed Polish origin by the procedure established in the Act on repatriation of 9 November 2000 (Dz.U. 2000 no. 106/1118) can also apply for the card, on the condition they fulfill the conditions stated above.

The Card can also be granted to children of holders of the Card. If only one parent holds the Card, the consent of the other expressed in a statement before a consul is necessary (on condition he or she has parental responsibility). Granting of the Charter to a minor who is over 16 years old may occur only with his or her consent.

== Rights of the holder ==
The Card does not mean acquiring citizenship or confirmation of Polish origin within the meaning of other acts. Nor does it entitle the holder to cross the border or settle in the territory of the Republic of Poland. A person of Polish origin wishing to settle in Poland needs a permanent residence card (however, after it is granted the person loses the right to apply for the Card and the document already granted is rescinded). A holder of the Card has the following rights:

The holder may apply for exemption from fees for consideration of an application for a country Schengen-visa (however, entitling to enter Poland only) and granting it or refund of fees. The refund is financed from the part of state budget controlled by the minister responsible for foreign affairs and is made through the proper consul.

A holder of the Karta Polaka has the right to:

1. exemption from the obligation to have a work permit for foreigners;
2. set up a company on the same basis as citizens of Poland;
3. study, do a doctorate and participate in the other forms of education, as well as participate in research and development work. The holder retains the right to apply for scholarships and other forms of aid for foreigners;
4. preschool, primary and secondary education in Poland;
5. use of health care services in the states of emergency;
6. 37% discount on public transport omnibus, flier and express rail travel;
7. free admission to state museums.

Enforcement of the rights listed in 3–7 (study, education, health care, public transport, museums) requires the presentation of the Card and a valid document confirming the identity of the holder.

== Granting procedure ==
The granting of the card is an administrative decision, followed by prescribed procedure commenced upon written application of the individual or his legal representative. The proper authority for the grant of the card is the consul of consular district of the place of residence. This procedure is free of consular fees.

The applicant is required to present documents or other evidences confirming compliance with the conditions for the granting of the Card. Examples of documents and evidence are:

- Polish identity documents
- vital records or their copies, baptism metric, school certificates or other documents proving relationship with Polishness;
- documents attesting military service in the Polish military formations;
- documents proving the deportation or imprisonment (e.g. Soviet repressions of 1939–1946) which include information of Polish origin;
- documents of rehabilitation of deported person which include information of Polish origin;
- foreign identity cards with information about the Polish nationality of the holder;
- attestation of entitled Polish or Polonial organization acting on the territory of one of the states mentioned above, confirming that he/she have been actively involved in activities on behalf of Polish language and culture or Polish national minority.
- final, legally binding decision on the determination of the Polish origin, as it is prescribed by the procedure established in the Act on repatriation of 9 November 2000 (on the basis of this decision the consul must grant the card).

A consul may exempt meritorious Poles from the obligation to fulfil the terms stated above.

The consul estimates Polish language proficiency and knowledge of Polish traditions and habits during interview with the applicant. Authorized employee of entitled Polish or Polonial organization can examine language proficiency as well. There are 34 entitled organizations, including Union of Poles in Belarus and Association of Poles in Lithuania.

Before issuing the decision to grant the card, the consul may ask Head of the Internal Security Agency or other administrative units whether there are reasons not to grant the charter (reasons of defence, security or protection of public order or acting of the applicant against the fundamental interests of the Republic of Poland).

The card is issued by a proper consul or person authorized by him for a ten-year period with a possible further extension of another 10 years. If possible, handing over of the card is carried out in a ceremonial manner. In the case of loss or destruction of the card, the consul issues a duplicate, at the request of the holder.

In the case of a negative decision of a consul, the applicant may appeal through the consul to the Council for Poles in the East.

== Applicants ==
According to Grzegorz Opalinski, consul general of Poland in Lviv, the number of Poles interested in receiving the Card may reach 200,000 in Western Ukraine. Polish consular services in Lviv received around 20,000 applications in the month of February 2009 alone. To meet the demand, consulates in both Lviv and Lutsk had to employ additional staff. Also, additional consulates of Poland were opened in January 2009, in Vinnytsia and Ivano-Frankivsk.

The process is hampered by the stance of governments of some nations, especially Belarus and Lithuania. In Lithuania, a conservative MP Gintaras Songaila publicly stated that two MPs who represent Polish minority there (Waldemar Tomaszewski and Michal Mackiewicz) should resign, because they accepted the Card. Similar opinion has been presented by Andrius Kubilius. Also, another problem is poor command of the Polish language, which is one of the conditions of granting the card. In Ukraine, according to estimates of Polish consul in Kyiv, Edward Dobrowolski, only about half applicants received their cards.

Polish Ministry of Foreign Affairs informed in late January 2009, that most applicants come from the areas of Hrodna, Brest, Lutsk and Lviv. 85% of all applicants were residents of either Belarus or Ukraine. However, there are applicants from other states as well. On March 9, 2009, the first Card in Azerbaijan was received by Ms. Helena Szejch-Zade, while the Polish consulate in Chişinău, Moldova, has been receiving a number of applications, mostly from the town of Bălţi, where there lives a 2,000-strong Polish minority.

== Statistics ==
Number of Pole's cards granted by country of residence
	2008	2009	2010	2011	2012	2013	2014	2015	2016	2017	2018	2019	2020	2021	2022	2023
Belarus	4,732	7,598	9,020	10,200	12,491	13,465	12,834	13,085	12,707	15,705	14,575	15,055	9,462	6,775	7,724	4,063
Ukraine	8,657	13,175	8,271	9,224	8,727	8,336	9,916	9,534	13,005	13,096	15,877	12,913	5,418	6,188	1,826	2,679
Russia	719	629	461	474	516	639	559	547	547	500	928	1,082	480	716	479	363
Other	1,590	2,544	1,598	1,724	1,482	1,242	1,146	946	1,205	2,855	4,268	5,129	3,519	4,213	17,456	8,079
Total	15,698	23,946	19,350	21,622	23,216	23,682	24,455	24,112	27,464	32,156	35,648	34,179	18,879	17,892	27,485	15,184

== Ratio legis ==
The Charter is intended to aid Polish communities abroad, e.g. by maintaining national heritage. Members of Polish minorities in the Post-Soviet states have limited access to Poland since Poland's joining the European Union's Schengen Agreement on 21 December 2007, which imposed stricter border controls and necessity of visas on Poland's eastern neighbors.

== See also ==
- Polish nationality law
- Polish diaspora
- The Foundation Aid to Poles in the East
- Polish identity card
- Polish passport
