= Polish identity card =

National identity card of Poland

Polish national identity card (Dowód osobisty)
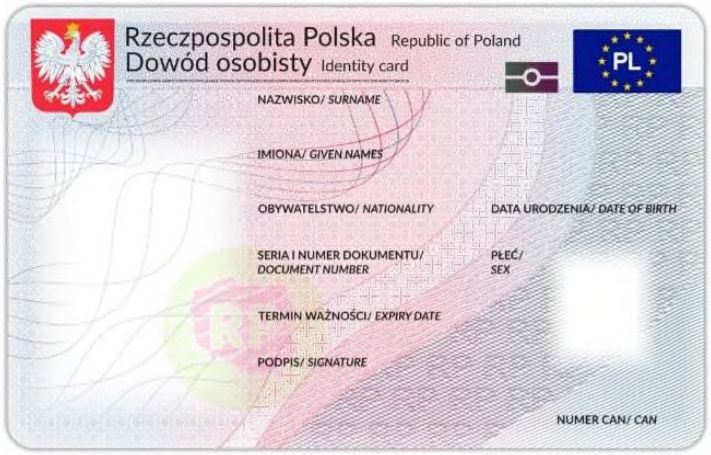
- Polish national ID card in the common EU design – issued from 8 November 2021

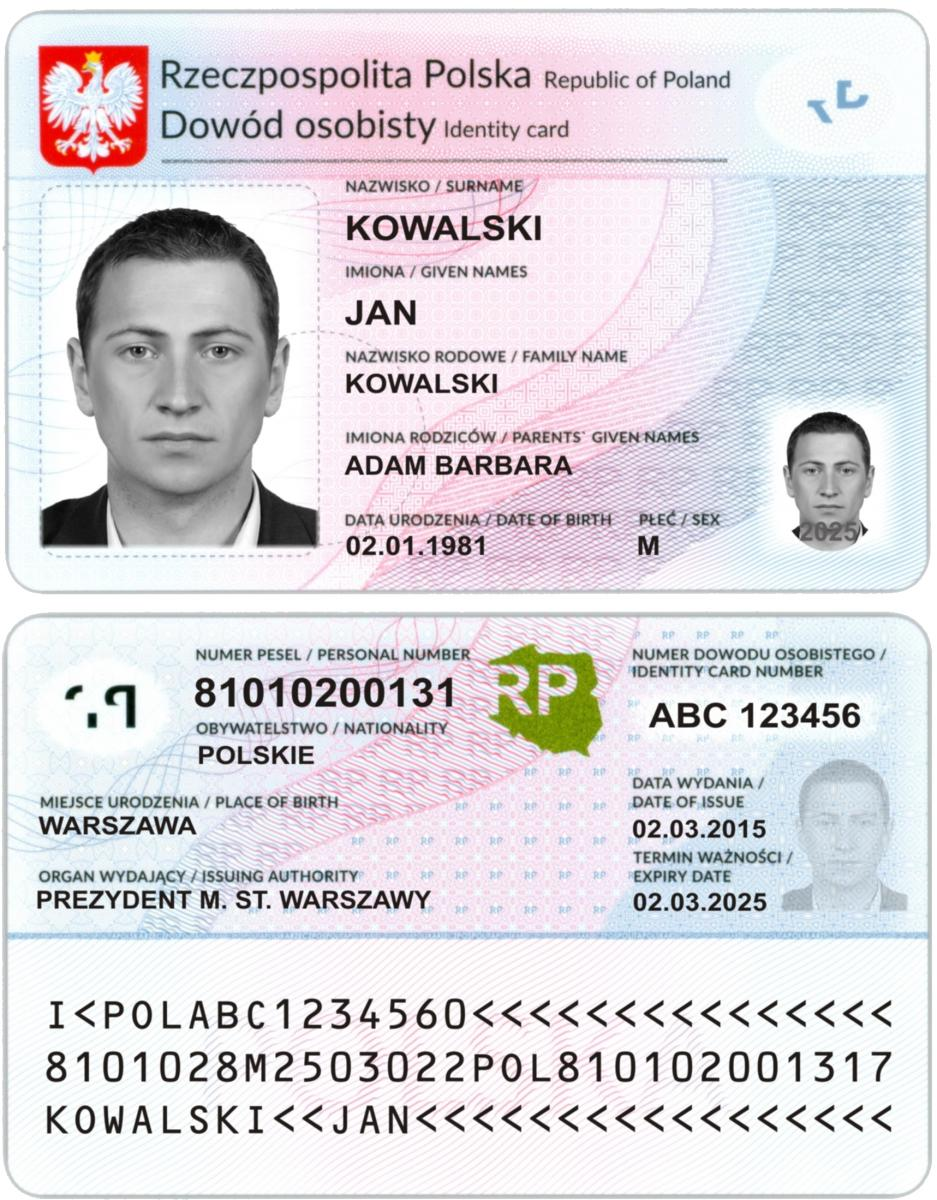
- Polish national ID card – 2015 version (front and back)
- Type: Identity document, travel document (in the listed countries)
- Issued by: Poland
- First issued: 1 January 2001 (plastic card); 4 March 2019 (biometric version); 27 November 2020 (current version)
- Valid in: European Union and the rest of Europe (except Belarus, Russia, Ukraine and United Kingdom) Georgia; Montserrat (max. 14 days); Overseas France; Turkey
- Expiration: 5 years (children up to 12 years); 10 years (children 12-18 years, adults over 18)

The Polish Identity Card is a national identity document issued to Polish citizens. As Poland is a European Union member state it is also serves a European Identity card. Every Polish citizen 18 years of age or older residing permanently in Poland is required to have an identity card (Polish: Dowód osobisty, lit. 'personal proof') issued by the local office of civic affairs. Children as well as Polish citizens living permanently abroad are entitled, but not required, to have one. Identity cards are valid for a period of 10 years (5 years for children under the age of 12 on the date of issue).

The front bears a photo of the holder, surname, forenames, date of birth, nationality, card number, gender and expiry date. It also contains the coat of arms of Poland. Below that, the card access number can be found. That number is necessary to connect with an embedded microchip (when using e-signature for instance).

On the back can be found the holder's place of birth (city or village in Poland or foreign country's name), date of issue, repeated card number, issuing authority, legal ascendant(s) name(s) and personal number (PESEL – Powszechny Elektroniczny System Ewidencji Ludności – universal electronic population database). Below the card number the bearer's photo is repeated. On the top of the back side the card access number is represented in a bar code.

The Polish identity card also functions as a travel document within Europe (except Belarus, Russia, Ukraine and United Kingdom) as well as French overseas territories, Turkey, Georgia and Montserrat (for max. 14 days) instead of a Polish passport.

== History ==
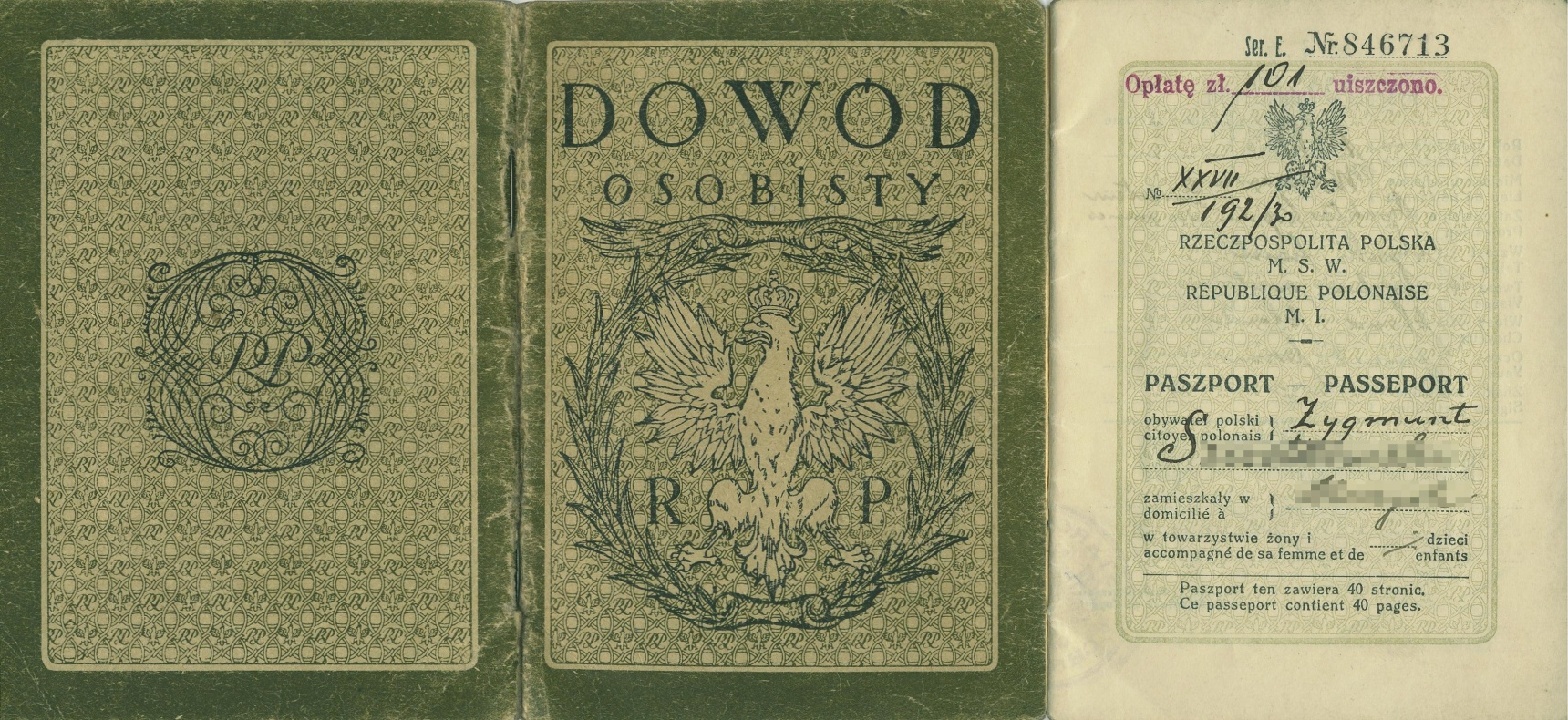
Polish identity card (left and centre) and passport (right) from 1930.

From 1919 until 1928, the term "Polish identity card" was used to describe the document necessary for foreign travel. This effectively served as a de facto passport for international travel (despite the name "personal ID card" on the inner cover it was already effectively a passport). The fee for its release was high: in June 1923 it was 90,000 Polish marks, and in 1930 101 Polish złotys. In this form, the "Polish identity card" also served as a form of resident registration in which temporary stays in the country were also entered (outside the place of permanent check-in). The pre-1928 "Polish identity card" took the form of a cardboard sheet folded in half and contained personal data, photography, occupation, religion, literacy information and description. Over time, evidence grew into a 16-page booklet in a cardboard cover, of which 11 pages were intended for credentials of reports.

The first true Polish identity card was introduced by presidential decree during the Second Polish Republic era in 1928. It was issued by commune offices at the request of interested persons for a fee of 60 groszy and was not mandatory (art. 18). This took the form of a card made of grey-blue, rigid paper folded in half.

During World War II, in areas of Poland occupied by Germany (General Government), Kennkarten were issued to Polish residents living in said areas.

In 1951–53, during the Polish People's Republic era, new internal passport booklets were introduced in which every Polish citizen had to be in possession of.

After the fall of communism in Poland, internal passport booklets continued to be issued until 2001, when a plastic card design was introduced.

== The 2015 issue ==
Since 2015, ID cards no longer contain the holder's registered residential address.

The security features include a small map of Poland at the top centre which changes colour between green and violet depending on the viewing angle. There is also a micro-printing in the card's background which reveals "RZECZPOSPOLITAPOLSKA" when magnified. Both the family name and date of birth have a special raised feel.

== The 2019 issue ==
Since March 2019, ID cards contain a RFID chip that stores personal data as well as a number of digital certificates that allow authentication of the holder or verify their identity in public or private digital systems.

To connect with a chip, a card access number and a personal identification number must be provided. The basic e-signature (recognised the same as handwritten signature by all public facilities, like municipal offices, central administration, courts etc.) functionality is provided free-of-charge for all citizens age 18 or older.

New e-IDs can also be used in automatic border gates at some Polish airports (namely Warsaw Chopin Airport, Modlin Airport and Poznań–Ławica Airport). Gates can also be used by all EU/EEA/CH e-passport holders, but only Polish citizens can use their e-IDs; other EU electronic identity cards are not accepted (but are fully accepted, as well as non-electronic IDs, when proceeding through manual border control performed by Border Guard officer).

== The 2021 issue ==
Since 8 November 2021 ID cards were redesigned to adjust to new common European Union identity card design. On that day, following changes were made:

- EU emblem was added (country code PL inside the circle of 12 yellow stars on blue background);
- handwritten signature of the bearer (previously removed on 2015 re-design);
- second biometric feature (two index fingerprints) is now included in RFID chip.

Fingerprints and handwritten signature are not collected from applicants age 12 or younger, that's why on-line application for them can still be made by a parent or legal guardian. For applicants age 12 or older, in-person application is necessary (for children 12–18 years old, application is filled out by a parent or legal guardian but child presence is also required for signature and fingerprints collection).

Application for person reaching 18 can be made solely by that person (without a parent's presence) not earlier than 30 days before 18th birthday.

== Open source licence violations ==
Software embedded in polish eID is thought to violate the licence of OpenSC library. Issuer of the document won't publish the code that uses OpenSC, because of "national security concerns".

== See also ==
- Karta Polaka
- Polish nationality law
- National identity cards in the European Economic Area
- Travel document (Poland)
