= Travel document (Poland) =

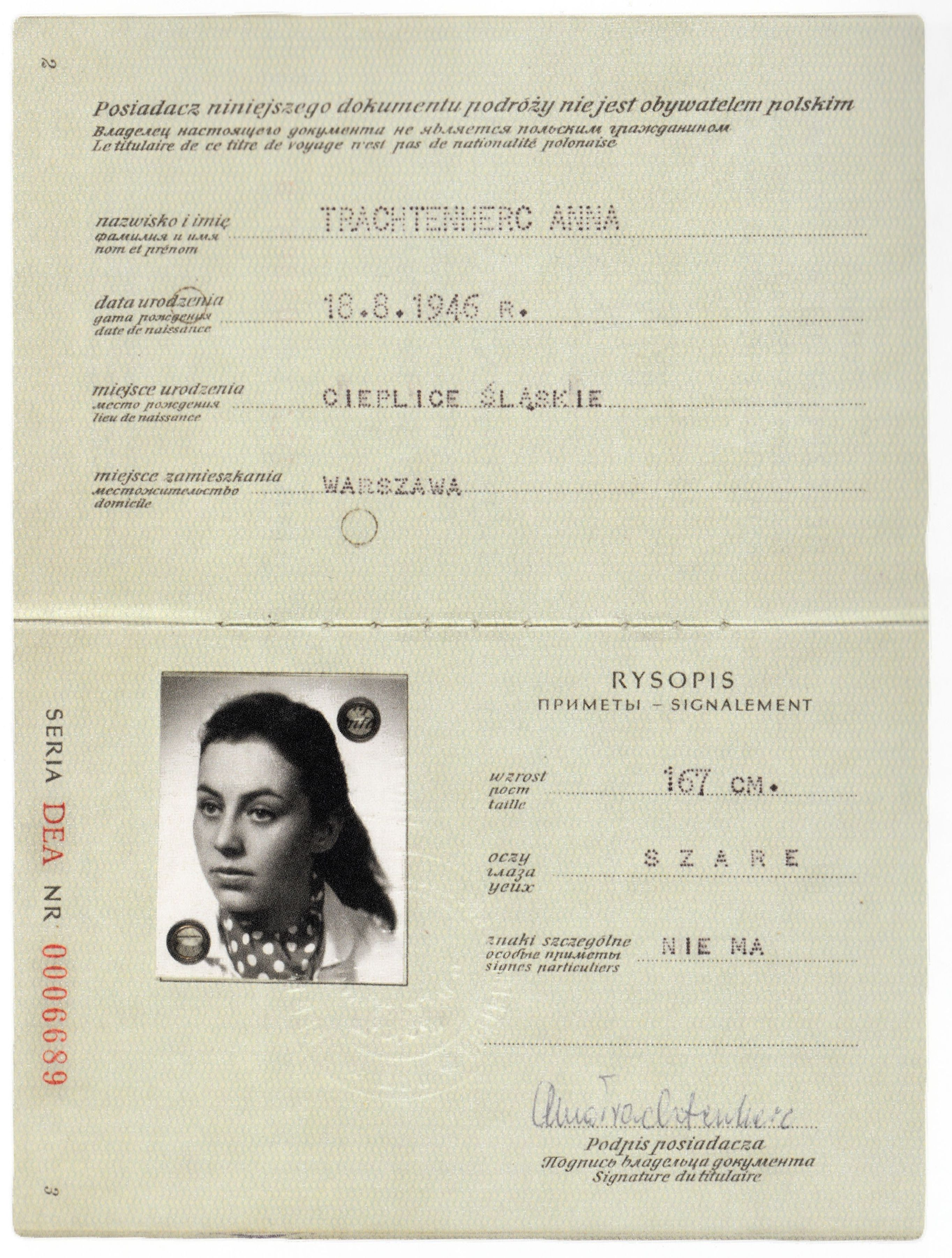
Travel document stating that the holder "is not a Polish citizen'.

Travel document is the official identity document in Poland for a person who is not a Polish citizen.

Such a document was issued to Polish citizens who renounced Polish citizenship so that they could go abroad. The document stated the identity of the person and the fact that "the holder of this document is not a Polish citizen".

During the wave of emigration in 1968, such a document was received, for example, by Jewish emigrants (and their non-Jewish spouses) or Germans leaving Poland after the Second World War.

Currently, a Polish travel document for a foreigner is issued to a foreigner who holds a permit to reside, a long-term EC residence permit or who enjoys subsidiary protection.
