= Polish passport =

Passport issued to Polish citizens

Polish passport; Polski paszport
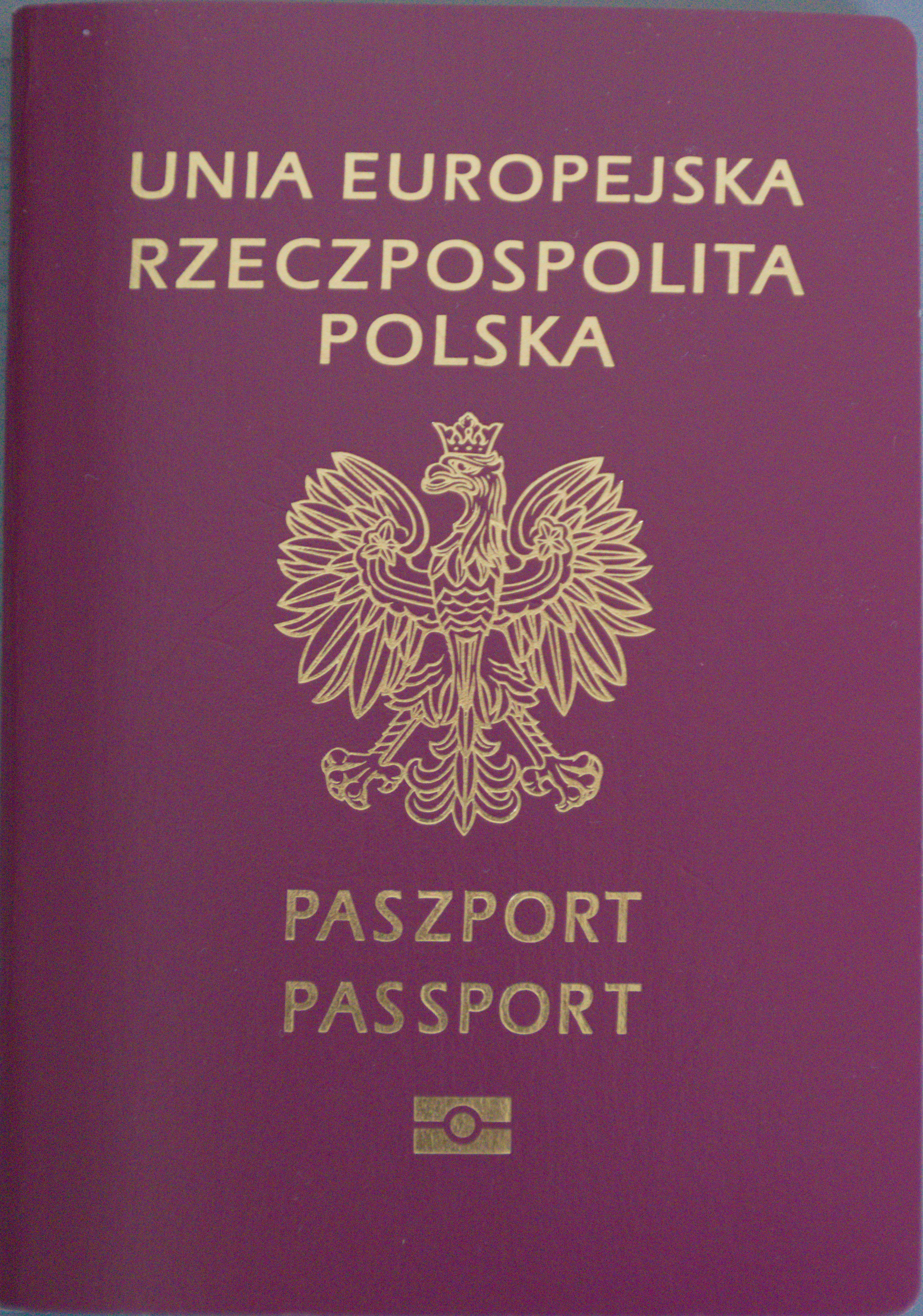
- The front cover of a contemporary Polish biometric passport

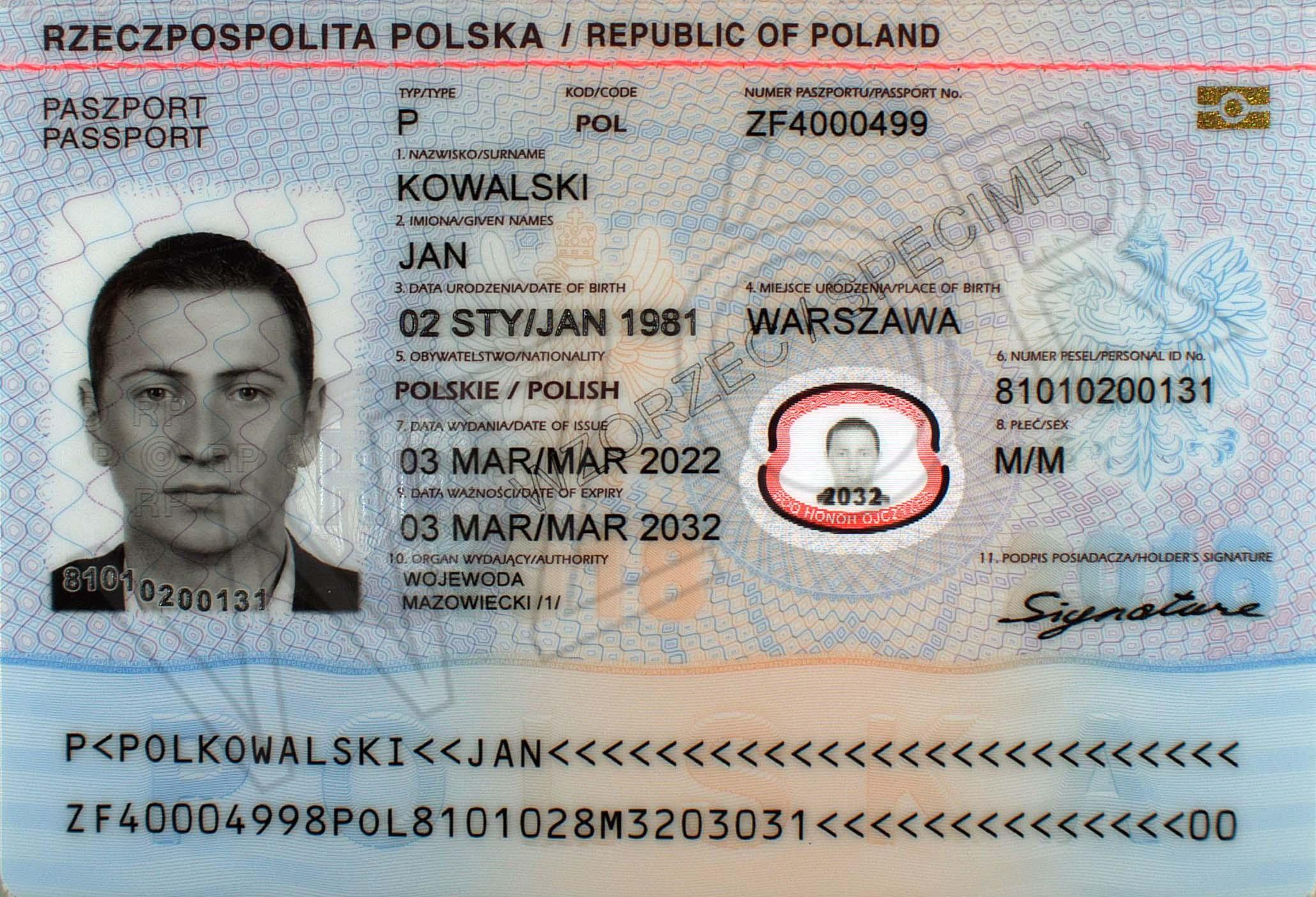
- The polycarbonate data page of the current Polish biometric passport
- Type: Passport
- Issued by: Poland
- First issued: 1918 (Second Polish Republic); 1929 (booklet); 1952 (Polish People's Republic); 1 January 1992 (Third Polish Republic); 2001 (machine-readable passport); 1 January 2006 (biometric version); 5 November 2018 (current version)
- Purpose: Identification
- Eligibility: Polish citizenship
- Expiration: 5 years for children aged 0–13, 10 years for people aged 13+, 1 year for emergency travel documents
- Cost: 140 PLN (adult under 70); 70 PLN (child above 12, adult with disabilities, students between 18 and 26 years old and few more groups); 35 PLN (students to 25, with valid Large Family Card) free (adults over 70); 30 PLN (child under 12); 15 PLN (child under 12 with valid Large Family Card) Temporary passport: 30 PLN; Second passport: 280 PLN

A Polish passport (Polish: Polski paszport) is an international travel document issued to nationals of Poland, and may also serve as proof of Polish citizenship. Besides enabling the bearer to travel internationally and serving as indication of Polish citizenship, the passport facilitates the process of securing assistance from Polish consular officials abroad or other European Union member states in case a Polish consular is absent, if needed.

Every Polish citizen is also a citizen of the European Union. The passport, along with the national identity card allows for free rights of movement and residence in any of the states of the European Union, European Economic Area and Switzerland.

According to the 2026 edition of the Henley Passport Index, the Polish passport allows visa-free travel to 183 countries and, together Hungary, Malaysia, and the United Kingdom, is ranked 6th globally in terms of travel freedom.

== Issuance and validity ==
The passports are issued by the Ministry of the Interior and applications are filed at Voivodeship offices which have a passport office, then are manufactured centrally at the Polish Security Printing Works (Polska Wytwórnia Papierów Wartościowych) in Warsaw. Passports issued since mid-2006 are of a biometric variety, and valid for ten years. The blue cover passports issued up until 2001 and burgundy-cover passports (issued up until 2006) remain valid until their stated expiry dates, however their lack of biometric features inherently means that they have slightly different visa restrictions for travel abroad as they are considered to have insufficient security features by some nations, such as Canada (allows visa-free access only for Polish citizens in possession of a biometric passport).

Full Polish passports are issued for a period of ten years, whilst those issued to minors are valid up to an initial maximum of five years.

Holders of passports issued before 13 April 1993 who seek to renew their passports require the additional document "Confirmation of Polish Citizenship" issued by their local provincial authority.

Temporary passports are issued for a period of one year.

== Previous passport designs ==
=== Second Polish Republic ===
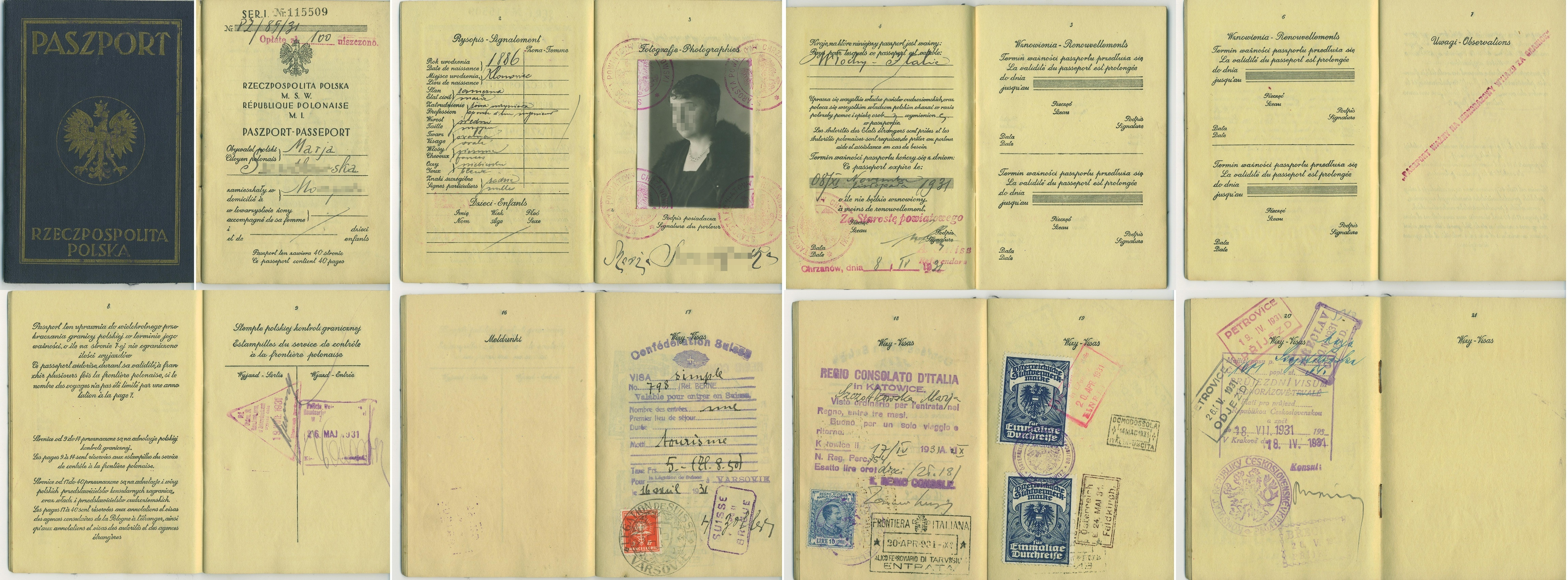
The complete set of pages from a Polish passport issued in 1931. At this time Polish passports were printed in only Polish and French

The Polish passport from today is much different from those that appeared after World War I, following the creation of the Second Polish Republic. The first such passports began to appear around 1918 and were of simple paper, design and quality. These lasted until around 1929 when hard covered blue-jacket passports were designed and printed on good quality watermarked paper. These blue passports were used through World War II and were continued to be issued to Polish refugees after the war from Polish consulates in foreign countries until at least 1947.

=== Polish People's Republic ===
During the communist Polish People's Republic (PRL) era, another design was adopted around 1952 consisting of the Polish, French and Russian languages. In addition during this period, the crown of the Polish white eagle was absent from the emblem on the passport cover. Until October 1956, in practice, it was only possible to obtain a passport for a business trip. Regarding the passport application, issued only by a Biuro Paszportów under the Ministry of Public Security, an applicant had to obtain 12 hard-to-get attachments. The effect of the rigorous passport policy was the practical disappearance of tourist travel from Poland: in 1938 citizens leaving the country for tourist purposes numbered approximately 90,000; there were only 181 such people in 1950, not counting party, union, and industry delegations, mainly to Warsaw Pact countries.

After 1956, trips abroad became easier; travel agencies such as Orbis were created to organise trips (80% of which was to the countries of "People's democracy"), and on the Polish-Czechoslovak border a tourist convention began to apply, facilitating movement in the Izera Mountains. However, an individual trip was still de jure possible only by invitation. At that time, there were two types of passports: personal and collective. For people travelling on collective passports, a special tour guide was available. Before each trip, a Polish citizen had to complete the application and go to a Biuro Paszportów attached to a local command of the Milicja Obywatelska. Upon arrival, the passport had to be returned to the same place.

Later (until 1972) the so-called "passport inserts" enabled travel to European Eastern Bloc countries, which had to be attached to the PRL internal passport. Initially, they were single-use; with time they began to be spent on multiple trips, generally from 1973 with a validity of five years. From 1972, thanks to an agreement with East Germany, it was possible to go to the latter country only on the basis of a stamp embedded in the ID card issued by any Milicja Obywatelska command. This resulted in a massive increase in trips to this country from 200,000 in 1971 to 9.5 million a year later. In January 1977, similar regulations were in force for trips to Bulgaria, Czechoslovakia, Romania, the USSR and Hungary. During martial law era (1981–83), the stamps were replaced by new passports with a five-year validity period.

Since 1984, Polish citizens have been allowed to keep their passports. It was not until December 1988 that long-term passports with 10 years validity and valid for all countries were introduced.

In addition, consular passports (Polish: paszport konsularny) could be issued for Polish citizens abroad in certain cases.

=== Third Polish Republic ===
A page from a 1992–2001 series Polish passport, showing stamps and security features in regular and UV light.

After the fall of communism in Poland, the first post-communist passport design was introduced on 1 January 1992, featuring a navy blue cover. This was later followed with a burgundy-cover machine-readable passport design in 2001, which was issued until 2006.

== Physical appearance and data contained ==
The Polish passports issued since 2006 are burgundy, with the words "UNIA EUROPEJSKA" (EUROPEAN UNION) and "RZECZPOSPOLITA POLSKA" (REPUBLIC OF POLAND) inscribed at the top of the front cover. The Polish white eagle is emblazoned in the centre of the cover, and below this the words "PASZPORT", "PASSPORT" are to be found. The Polish passport has the standard biometric symbol emblazoned below the final set of text denoting the document as a passport, and uses the standard European Union design. Diplomatic passports are also burgundy in colour and of essentially the same design, but the French, English and Polish translations of the word 'passport' are replaced with those for 'diplomatic passport'; "PASZPORT DYPLOMATYCZNY", "DIPLOMATIC PASSPORT".

Temporary passports have the words "PASZPORT TYMCZASOWY", "TEMPORARY PASSPORT" on the front cover and contain 16 pages. They do not bear the biometric passport logo.

The statement in a Polish passport declares in Polish and English:

THE AUTHORITIES OF THE REPUBLIC OF POLAND HEREBY KINDLY REQUEST ALL WHOM IT MAY CONCERN TO PROVIDE THE BEARER OF THIS PASSPORT WITH ALL ASSISTANCE THAT MAY BE DEEMED NECESSARY WHILE ABROAD.

The Polish statement for which is:

WŁADZE RZECZYPOSPOLITEJ POLSKIEJ ZWRACAJĄ SIĘ Z UPRZEJMĄ PROŚBĄ DO WSZYSTKICH, KTÓRYCH MOŻE TO DOTYCZYĆ, O OKAZANIE POSIADACZOWI TEGO PASZPORTU WSZELKIEJ POMOCY, JAKA MOŻE OKAZAĆ SIĘ NIEZBĘDNA W CZASIE POBYTU ZA GRANICĄ.

=== Biometric data ===
The biometric passports contain an RFID chip containing the passport's printed data in a digital format along with the photograph in a JPEG format along with a digital key to verify that the data contained is authentic and has not been tampered with. The data in the chip can only be accessed after using the printed codes on the lower part of the passport's personal data page. The European Union requires fingerprint data to be stored on the member state's passports at latest in June 2009. Poland already complies with this European act on collecting identity data, and, since 2006, requires passport applicants to provide fingerprint scans and other information relating to facial features when applying for a new passport.

=== Languages ===
The data page/information page is printed in Polish and English, whilst translation of this information into other official languages of the European Union can be found elsewhere in the document. The passport also contains two pages reserved for official notifications which are typically only recorded in Polish.

== Visa free travel ==
Visa requirements for Polish citizens Poland Freedom of movement Visa not required / ETA (Note: ETA required for Canada if arriving by air, Cape Verde, Kenya, New Zealand, South Korea and the United States.) (Note: Including Australian eVisitor.) Visa on arrival (Note: Including tourist card required in advance for Cuba.) eVisa (Note: Including visa on arrival with ETA for Pakistan.) Visa available both on arrival (Note: Including visa on arrival with ETA for Sri Lanka.) or online (Note: Including Indonesian e-VOA.) Visa required prior to arrival

Visa requirements for Polish citizens are administrative entry restrictions by the authorities of other states placed on citizens of Poland. Polish citizens enjoy freedom of movement in the European Economic Area and can travel around the EEA as of right. As of July 2023, Polish citizens had visa-free or visa on arrival access to 186 countries and territories, ranking the Polish passport 6th in the world terms of travel freedom according to the Henley Passport Index (tied with Hungary and Australian passports). Polish citizens can live and work in any country within the EU, EEA and Switzerland as a result of the right of free movement and residence granted in Article 21 of the EU Treaty.

== Gallery of Polish passports ==
Passport gallery

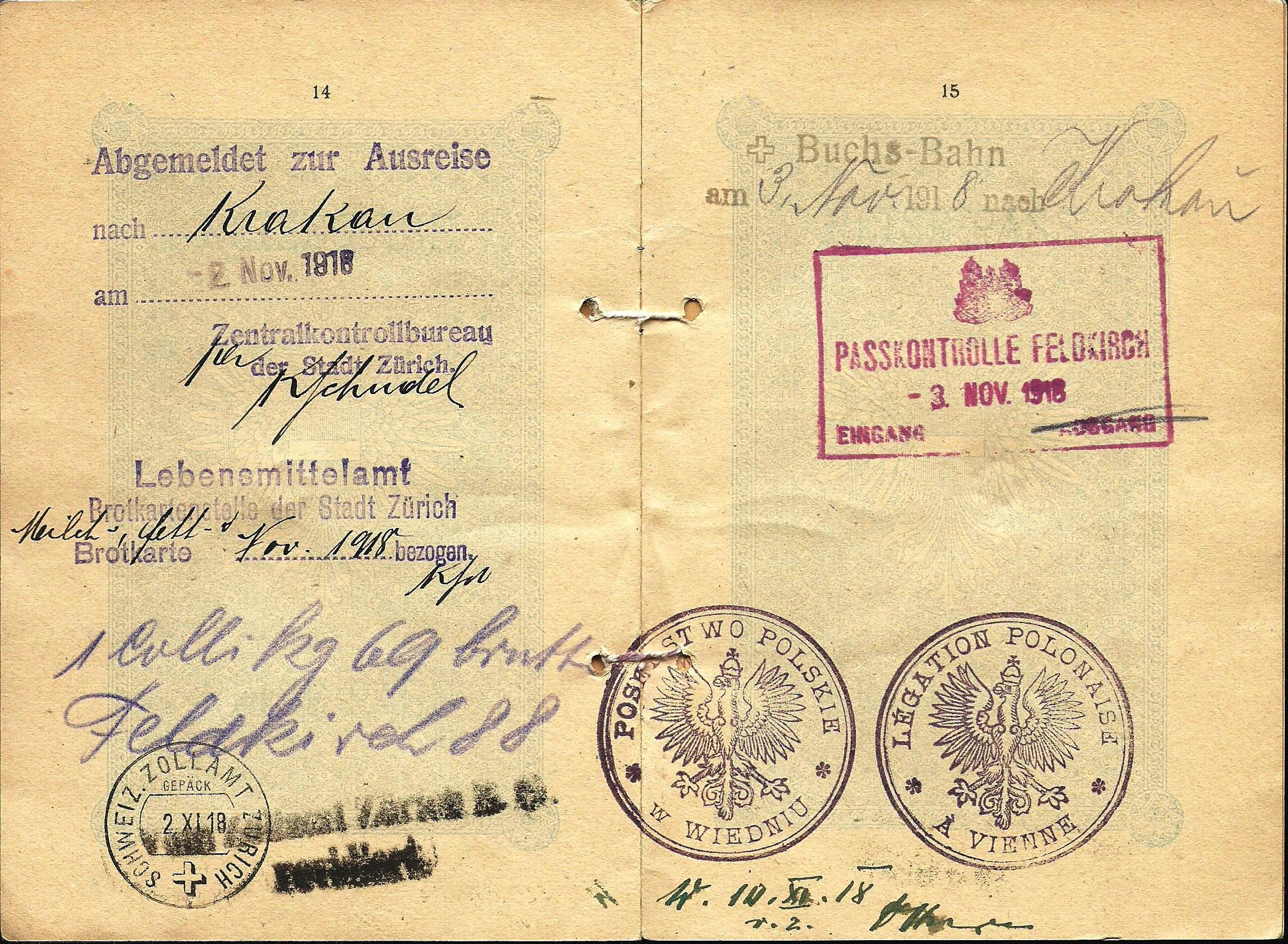
1918 Polish consular validation of a passport

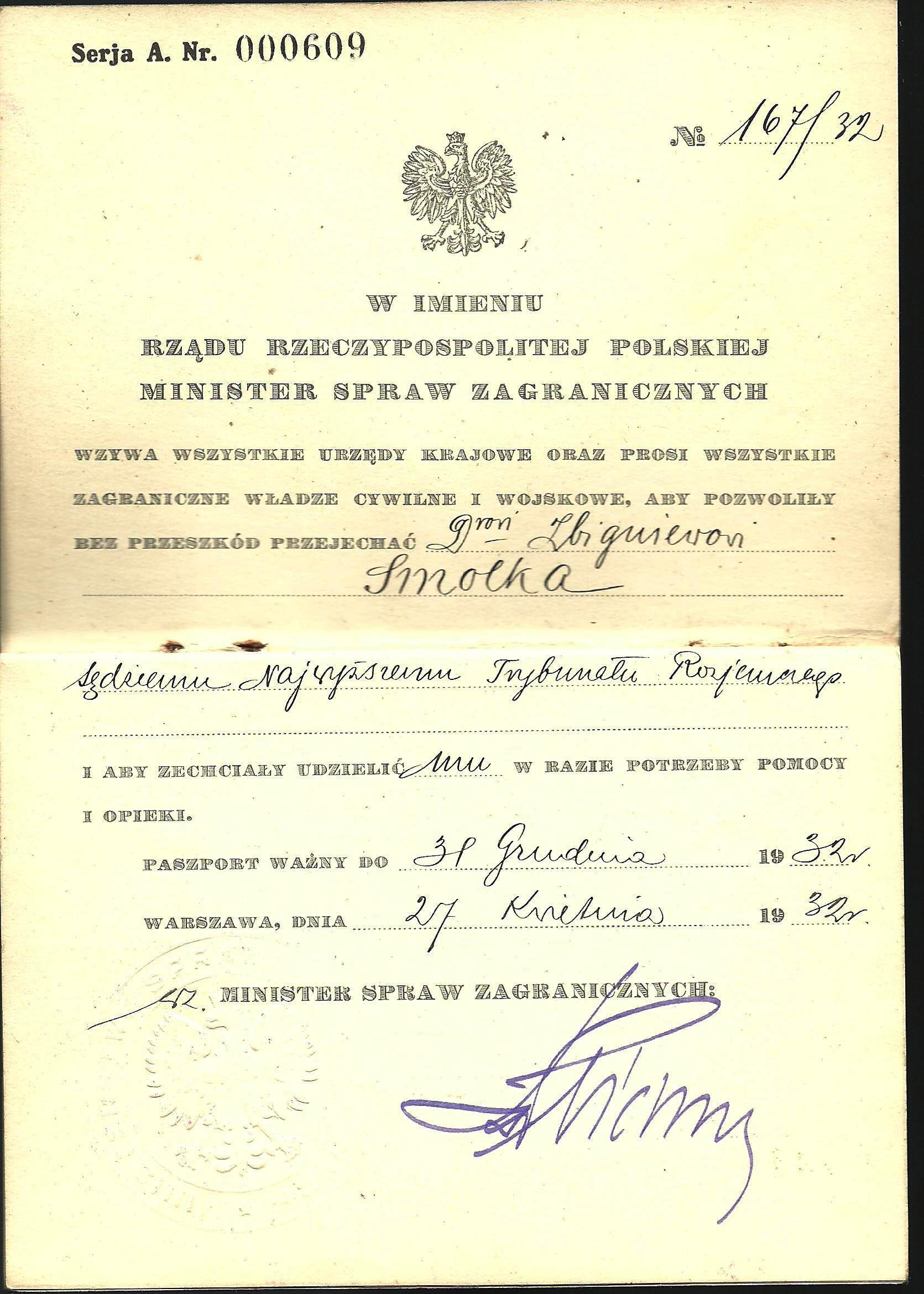
1932 Official Polish passport issued by the Foreign Ministry in Warsaw

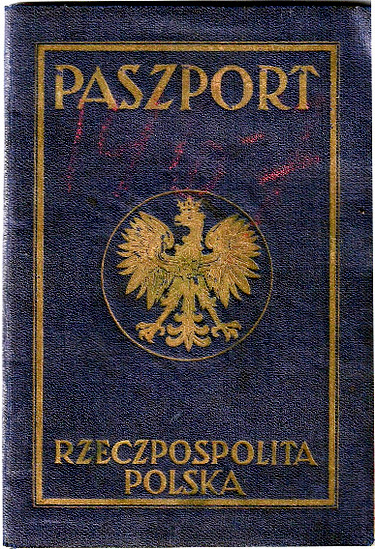
1934 Polish passport booklet cover of the Second Polish Republic

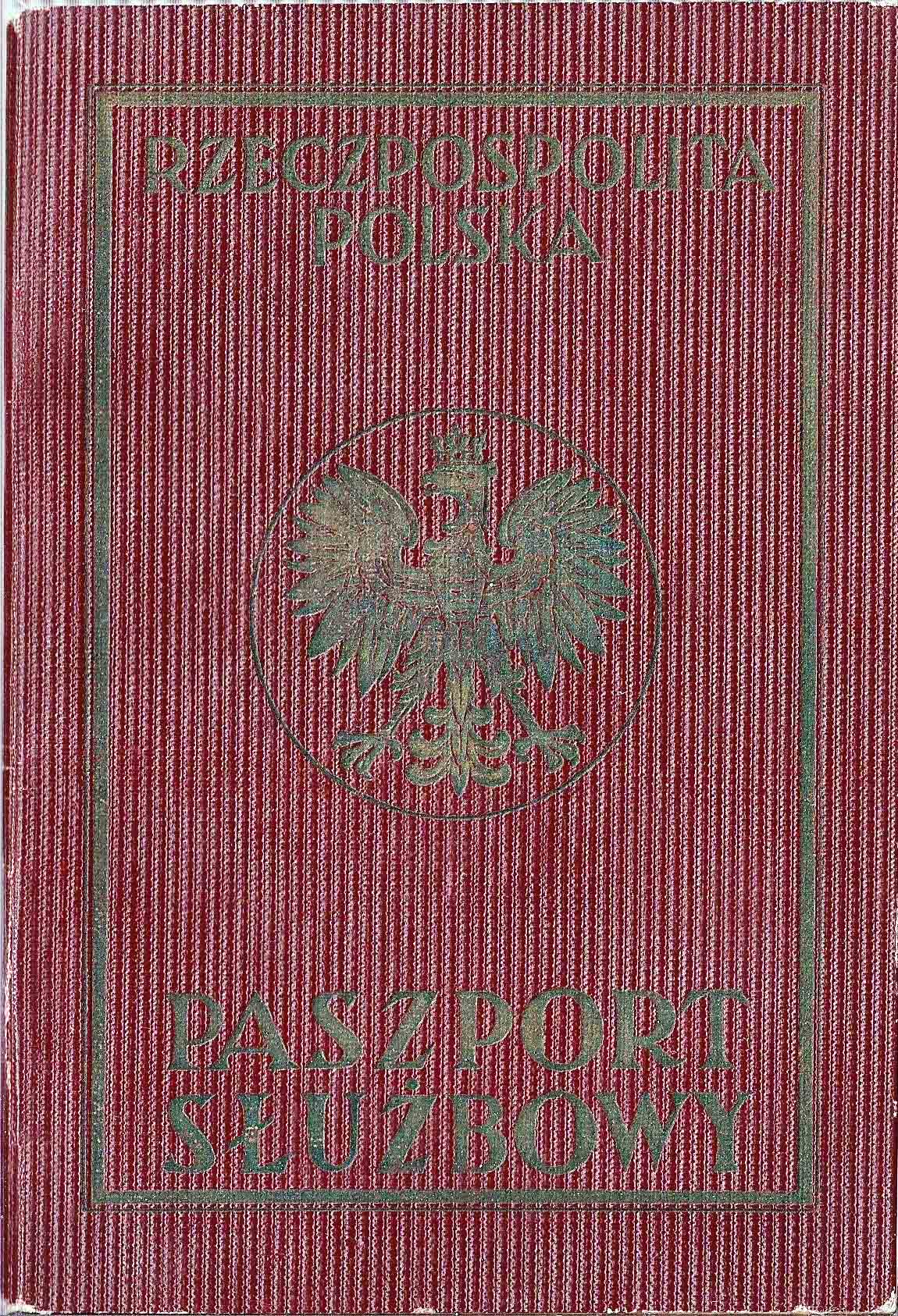
Polish service passport used by an employee at the consulate in Germany 1936–1939

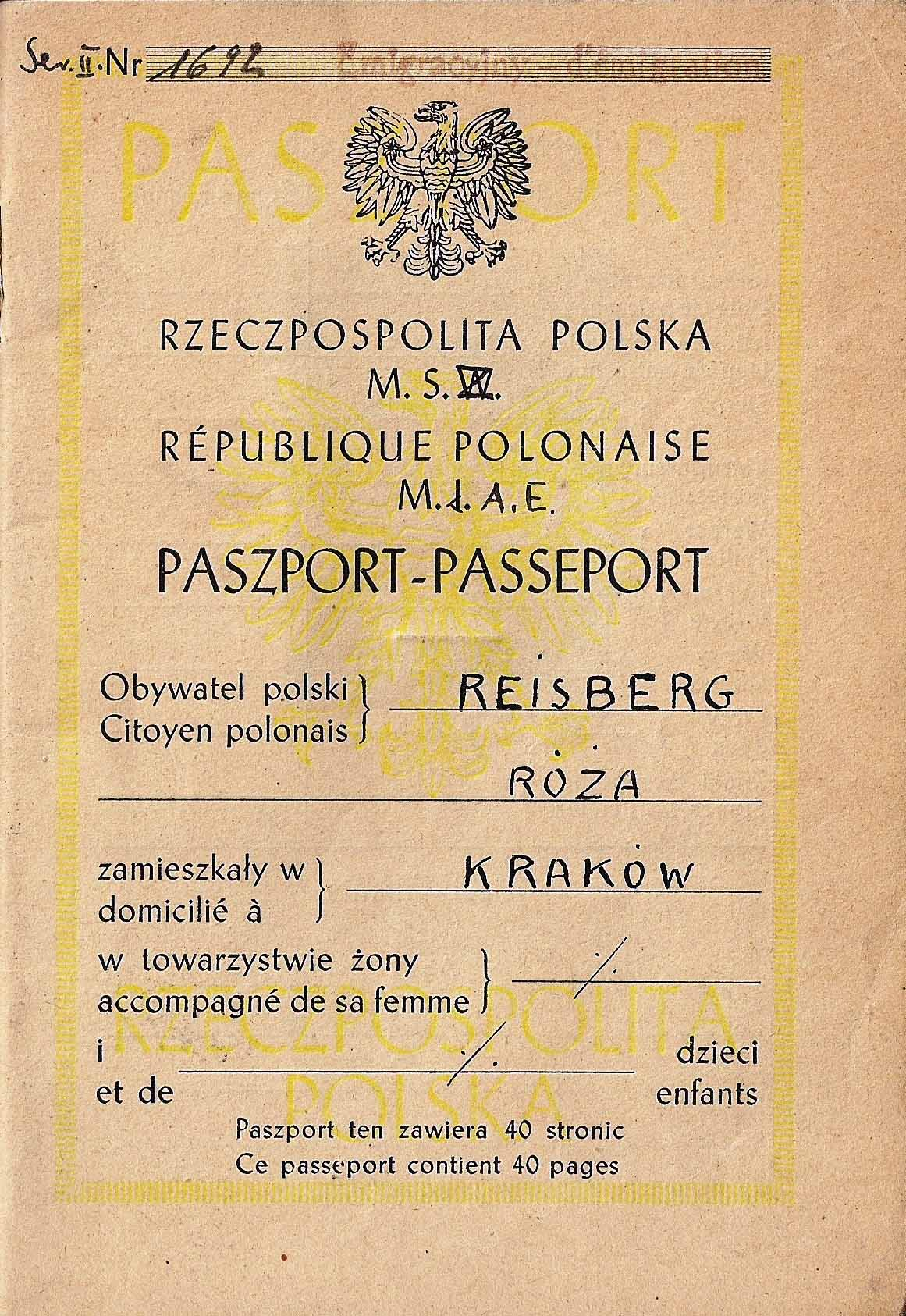
First post-war Polish passport, used in the second half of 1945

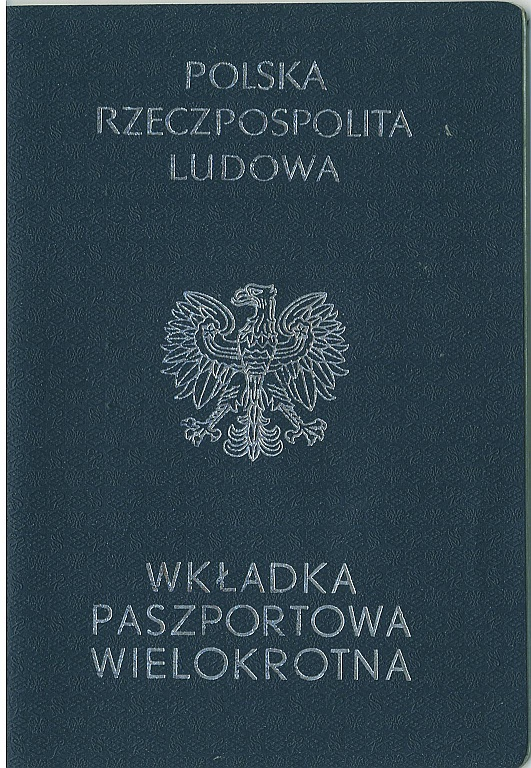
Cover of a PRL "passport insert" valid only for Eastern Bloc countries

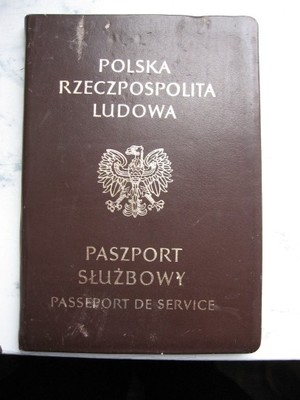
PRL service passport

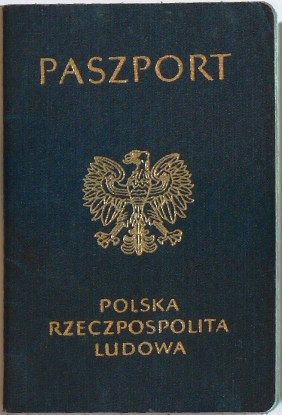
PRL ordinary passport cover (until fall of communism - 1990)

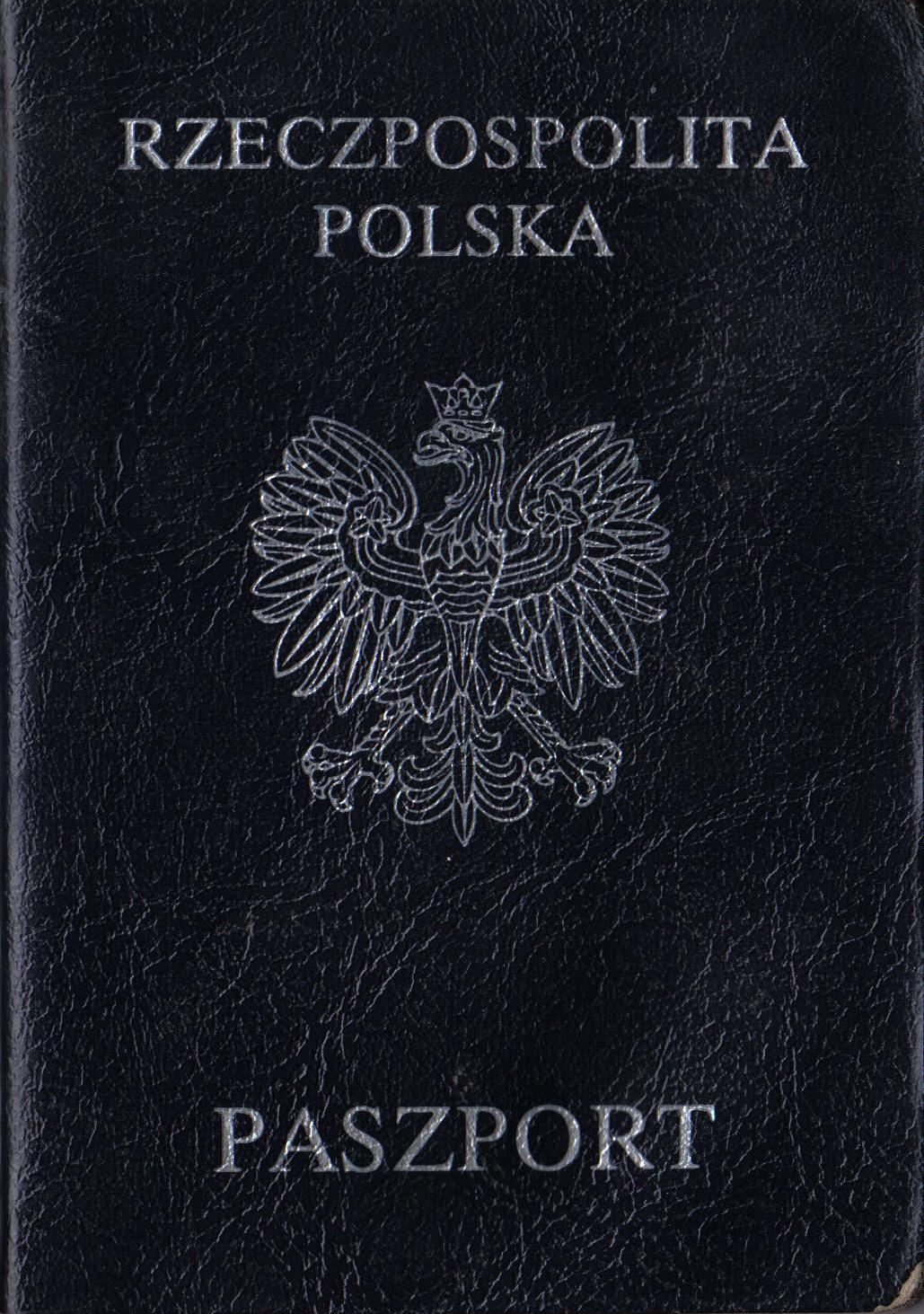
Passport cover 1992–2001

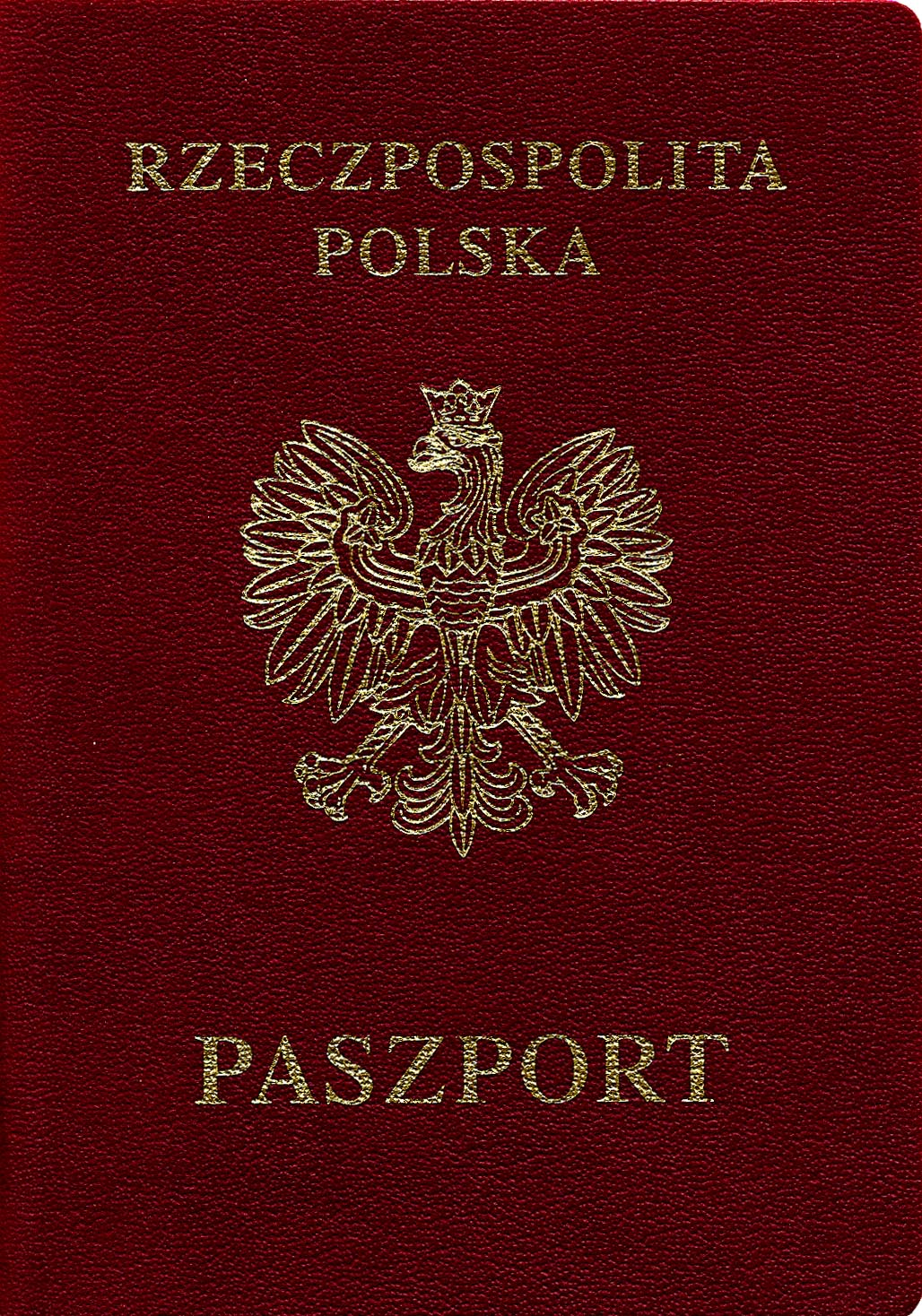
Passport cover 2001-2006

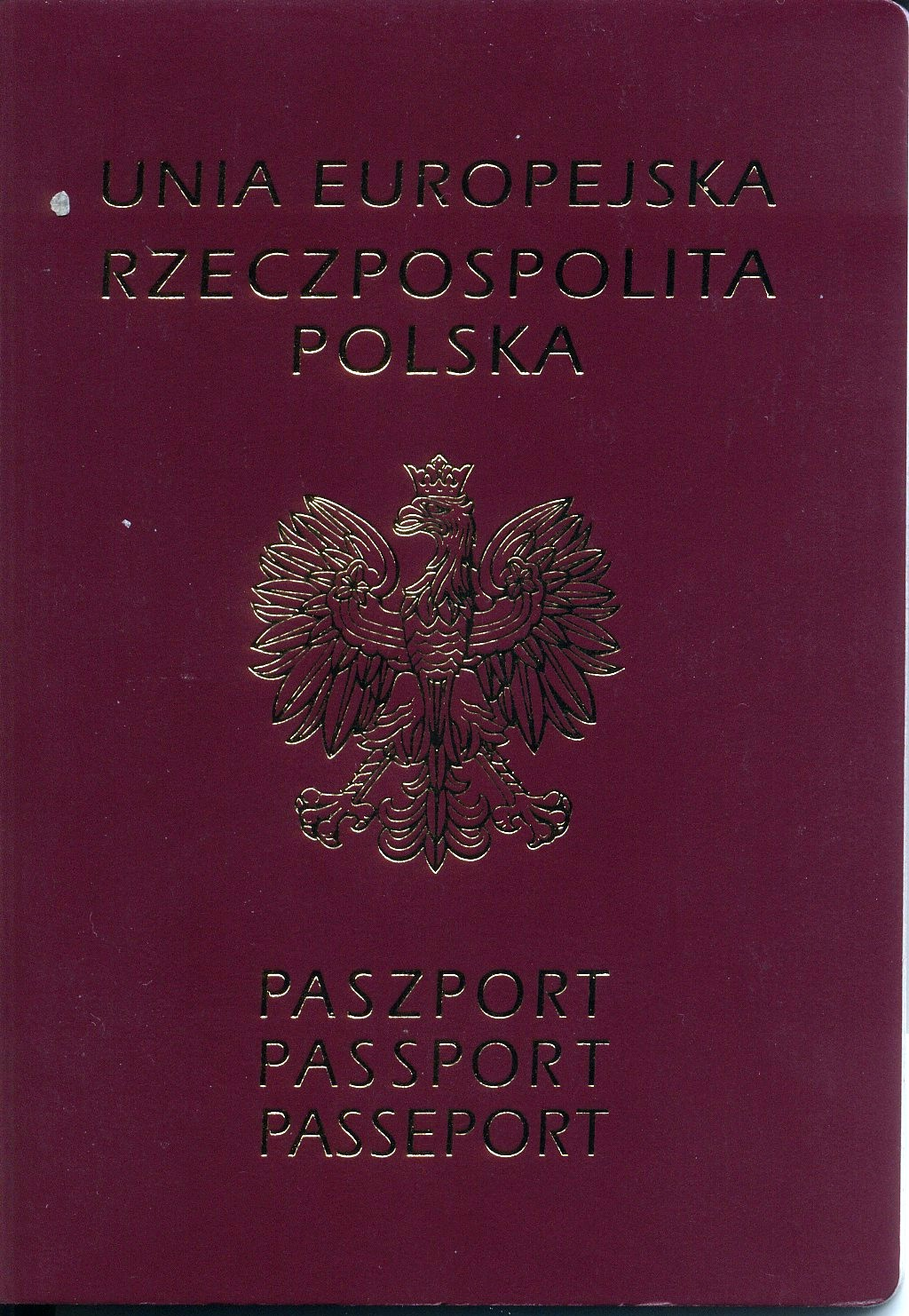
Passport cover 2007 (non-biometric)

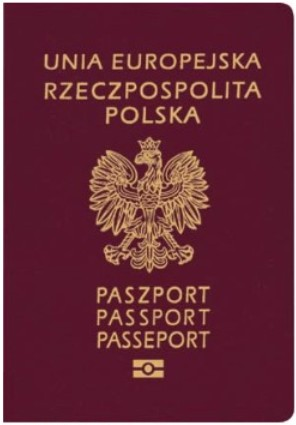
Biometric passport cover 2006–6 November 2018

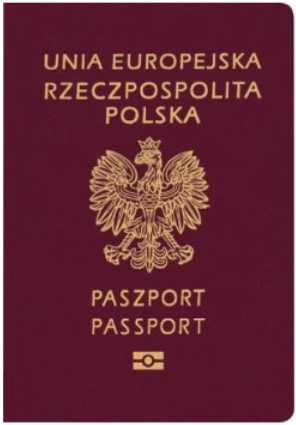
Biometric passport cover 6 November 2018-Present

== See also ==
- Polish nationality law
- List of passports
- Visa requirements for Polish citizens
- Passports of the European Union
