= Polish nationality law =

Polish Citizenship Act

Parliament of Poland
- Long title: An Act relating to Polish citizenship
- Enacted by: Government of Poland
- Status: Current legislation

Polish nationality law is based primarily on the principle of jus sanguinis. Children born to at least one Polish parent acquire Polish citizenship irrespective of place of birth. Besides other things, Polish citizenship entitles the person to a Polish passport.

Polish citizenship and nationality law is set out in the Polish Citizenship Act of 2009, which was published on 14 February 2012, and became law in its entirety on 15 August 2012.

Its provisions cover a range of Polish citizenship issues, including dual citizenship; acquisition by law (including birth, grant, recognition, and restoration); loss; status of minors vis-a-vis parents; and various processes and regulations.

== Citizenship by birth ==
=== Foundling ===
A foundling born in Poland acquires Polish citizenship when both parents are unknown, or when their citizenship cannot be established, or if determined to be stateless. Polish citizenship is bestowed upon stateless children over sixteen years of age only with their consent.

=== Adoption ===
Polish citizenship may also be acquired through the final adoption of a minor under the age of 16 by a Polish citizen, and is deemed retroactive to birth.

== Citizenship by descent ==
A child born to a Polish parent is automatically a Polish citizen at birth. It is irrelevant where the child is born. Citizenship can generally be claimed only by descendants of Polish citizens.

However, historically, because the newly independent Poland comprised lands from Germany, Russia, and Austria-Hungary, who became a Polish citizen was unclear. Article 2 of the Polish Citizenship Act of 1920 referred back to the residency laws of these former states, and also "international treaties". Those without a right to Polish citizenship were considered to have only "Polish origins" but not citizenship. Thus, not all ethnic Poles could claim Polish citizenship if they had left Poland before the country became an independent state in 1918. Also, there can be no break in Polish citizenship between the emigrant ancestor and the descendant. If the applicant's ancestor lost Polish citizenship, such as by becoming a citizen of another country before 1951, the descendant did not inherit Polish citizenship through that ancestor. Application for "Confirmation of Possession or Loss of Polish Citizenship" can be made through Polish embassies or consulates abroad.

== Polish migrants before 1962 ==
Special rules exist concerning the acquisition and loss of Polish citizenship before 1962:

- Between 1918 and 1951, acquisition of another citizenship caused the loss of Polish citizenship. Polish citizenship was also lost through service in another country's military or acceptance of a "public office" in another country. However, under the "military paradox" rule, males who had not completed compulsory military service to Poland, unless somehow excused from the obligation, could not lose Polish citizenship as above. (See Art. 11 of the 1920 Polish Citizenship law.)
- In 1951, Poland revoked its citizenship for all inhabitants, including ethnic Poles, of the former Polish territories east of the Curzon line that had been annexed by the Soviet Union in 1945. Those individuals had been naturalized as Soviet citizens and later, after the dissolution of the Soviet Union in 1991, acquired the citizenship of one of the resulting countries: Belarus, Ukraine, Lithuania, Latvia, Estonia, or Russia. Polish citizenship was also revoked for citizens of Germany who were residing outside Poland, unless they had a Polish spouse who was resident in Poland.
- Polish citizens who emigrated to Israel between 1958 and 1984, and who normally became Israeli citizens on arrival (based on the Israeli "Law of Return" for those of Jewish descent), lost Polish citizenship automatically. They and their descendants may be eligible to acquire Polish citizenship by declaration.

== Naturalization ==
Foreigners may naturalize as Polish citizens after residing in the country for at least three years based on a permanent residence permit, an EU long-term residence permit, or the right of permanent residence. The residency requirement is reduced to two years for stateless persons, refugees, and spouses of Polish citizens. Applicants must demonstrate at least B1 proficiency in the Polish language and a stable source of income.

== Loss of Polish citizenship ==
Since 1962, Polish law, including the Constitution, has not allowed the government to revoke someone's citizenship. Renunciation of Polish citizenship requires a petition with extensive supporting documentation subject to the approval of the President of Poland. Administrative processing of the petition can take up to several years and the President's decision is final and cannot be appealed in court.

Starting in 1968, the former communist regime initiated an antisemitic campaign that forced out of Poland from 15,000 to 20,000 Polish Jews, who were stripped of their Polish citizenship.

Their Polish passports confiscated, replaced with a travel document that did not allow them to return, and their properties expropriated by the state, the mostly Holocaust survivors and their children emigrated to Israel, the United States, Denmark, Sweden, and elsewhere.

The High Court in Warsaw accepted a petition filed by Baruch-Natan Yagil, who was forced to leave Poland in 1968, and ruled that the Polish government erred in revoking the plaintiff's citizenship, and should restore it, and issue him a Polish passport.

During a 2006 visit to Israel, President Lech Kaczyński promised to restore Polish citizenship. No blanket legislation covering the issue exists, but when applying for the confirmation of their Polish citizenship, these Jews and their offspring will usually get a positive result in the first instance or the second one, in an appeal to the ministry of interior.

Jews and Israelis who were invited to Warsaw to mark the 40th anniversary of Poland's purging of the Jews on 8 March 1968, will be given back their Polish citizenship.

=== Loss criteria ===
The issue of losing one's citizenship before 1962 is complex, and the different principles of the law governing it are the following:

1. A person born before the 1951 law entered into force may inherit only the Polish citizenship of their father if their parents were married, or their mother-otherwise.
2. A person who joined a foreign army (even if never served but conscripted on paper), worked in a public job in a foreign country (very wide and volatile definition for that but this includes: teacher, religious leader, postman and even in a territory not defined as a country like British Palestine) or received any foreign citizenship prior to the entry into force of the law of 1951 – loses their citizenship immediately, and if a married man, also his wife and minor children (younger than 18) lose their citizenship.
  1. Nevertheless, if they were not exempt from Polish army duty then only getting foreign citizenship will not revoke their Polish one. Public work and army register will always cause the loss of citizenship. Therefore, an adult unmarried woman has lost her citizenship on obtaining foreign citizenship before 1951, because they had no military duty in Poland. Married women stayed under the "protection" of their husband's citizenship and kept it as long as the husband didn't lose it.
  2. On the other hand, in the case of men there are two conditions which need to prevail: men who both got foreign citizenship and passed the age of Polish military duty (50 since the law changed on 29 May 1950) had lost their citizenship.
3. A person who obtained a foreign citizenship (non Polish) due to the changes of the borders after World War II, or had Russian, Ukrainian, Belarusian, Lithuanian, Latvian, or Estonian citizenship in 1951 had lost their Polish citizenship (see clause 4 of the second law). Nonetheless, if the ex-Pole returned to Poland afterwards due to the different agreements of repatriation that were signed between the USSR and Poland (e.g., in 1945 and 1956), then they regained their Polish citizenship. In fact, every Pole that became a Soviet citizen and did not take advantage of the opportunity to come back to Poland due to these agreements, lost their Polish citizenship.
4. In order to confirm the citizenship of a person who left before 1951, it will be easier to prove that they left Poland after the first law from 1920 entered into force. Otherwise it will be difficult to prove their Polish citizenship. If the parents stayed in Poland after 1920 it might help.
5. The law from 1920 allows for citizenship to pass from father to his born-out-of-wedlock child only if the father declared his paternity before the child turned 18 and only in front of Polish authorities. Hence, without an original birth certificate with the father's name it might be difficult to prove.
6. The law from 1962 allows for citizenship to pass from father to his born-out-of-wedlock child only if the father declared his paternity within one year from birth. Hence, such children of only a Polish father (mother is not Polish) born when this law was in force must show an original birth certificate or a paternity declaration signed before they turned one year old (in Israel, this declaration is usually done in the hospital, when registering as the newborn's father and it is saved in the archives of the Ministry of Interior and a copy of it can be issued on request).
7. The issue of citizenship of children whose parents had different nationalities was regulated not only in the provisions of the Act on Polish Citizenship, but also in the international agreements ratified by Poland in the field of citizenship. This means that, in such a case, the provisions of the Polish Citizenship Act were not applied. In the 60s and 70s Poland signed with some countries of Central and Eastern Europe the conventions on avoidance of multiple nationality from which it withdrew in the 90s and 2000s.

== Dual citizenship ==
Polish law does not explicitly allow dual citizenship, but possession of another citizenship is tolerated since there are no penalties for its possession alone. However, penalties exist for exercising foreign citizenship, such as identifying oneself to Polish authorities using a foreign identification document. Poland treats nationals of other countries whom it considers Polish citizens as if they were solely Polish. Serving in a foreign military does not require permission of Polish military authorities, if the person resides in that foreign country and has its citizenship.

Because Polish citizenship is determined by the citizenship of a Polish parent without any explicit limitation for the number of generations elapsed abroad for descendants of Polish emigrants, individuals of Polish descent born abroad who, in spite of having no ties to Poland, are nevertheless subject to all obligations of Polish citizenship, formerly including military service (Poland suspended compulsory military service on December 5, 2008 by the order of the Minister of Defence and compulsory military service was formally abolished when the Polish parliament amended conscription law on January 9, 2009; the law came into effect on February 11) may have problems. In addition, such individuals are not entitled to consular protection of their home country under Article 36 of the Vienna Convention on Consular Relations. The only exception is when a bilateral consular agreement calls for recognition of the expatriate citizenship, regardless of the allegations of Polish citizenship raised by Poland. Such an agreement was negotiated in the 1972 Consular Convention between the United States and Poland providing that:

"Persons entering the Republic of Poland for temporary visits on the basis of United States passports containing Polish entry visas will, in the period for which temporary visitor status has been accorded (in conformity with the visa's validity), be considered United States citizens by the appropriate Polish authorities for the purpose of ensuring the consular protection provided for in Article 29 of the Convention and the right of departure without further documentation, regardless of whether they may possess the citizenship of the Republic of Poland."

However, since Poland abolished visa requirements for United States citizens in 1991, this provision no longer applies.

The problems resulting for members of the Polish diaspora, Polonia, from being treated by Poland solely as Polish citizens are compounded by the difficulty to renounce Polish citizenship (see above).

Poland has been enforcing with varying stringency its claims to citizenship allegiance from descendants of Polish emigrants and from recent refugees from Polish Communism who became naturalized in other countries. Under a particularly strict enforcement policy, named by the Polish expatriate community the "passport trap", citizens of the United States, Canada, and Australia were prevented from leaving Poland until they obtain a Polish passport. The governments of the United States and Canada have issued travel warnings for Poland, still in effect in February 2007, to those "who are or can be claimed as Polish citizens" that they are required to "enter and exit Poland on a Polish passport" and will not be "allowed to leave Poland until a new Polish passport has been obtained".

Travelers to Poland who have Polish ancestors are advised to obtain in writing a statement from a Polish Consulate as to whether or not they will face any obligations in Poland, such as military service, taxation, or the requirement to obtain a Polish passport.

In December 2007, Poland established a Polish Charter which can grant some rights of Polish citizenship to people of Polish descent who do not have Polish citizenship and who reside in ex-USSR.

== Citizenship of the European Union ==
Because Poland forms part of the European Union, Polish citizens are also citizens of the European Union under European Union law and thus enjoy rights of free movement and have the right to vote in elections for the European Parliament. When in a non-EU country where there is no Polish embassy, Polish citizens have the right to get consular protection from the embassy of any other EU country present in that country. Polish citizens can live and work in any country within the EU as a result of the right of free movement and residence granted in Article 21 of the EU Treaty.

== Travel freedom of Polish citizens ==
Visa requirements for Polish citizens

Visa requirements for Polish citizens are administrative entry restrictions by the authorities of other states placed on citizens of Poland. In 2024, Polish citizens had visa-free or visa-on-arrival access to 189 countries and territories, ranking the Polish passport 7th in the world according to the Henley Passport Index.

In 2017, the Polish nationality is ranked twentieth in Nationality Index (QNI). This index differs from the Visa Restrictions Index, which focuses on external factors including travel freedom. The QNI considers, in addition, to travel freedom on internal factors such as peace & stability, economic strength, and human development as well.
