= Consular passport (Poland) =

Polish passport for citizens abroad

A consular passport (Polish: paszport konsularny) was a passport-type document issued by Polish consulates abroad during the times of the Communist Poland.

They were in two formats. A "booklet consular passport" (Polish: paszport konsularny książeczkowy) was issued to the citizens of Poland with permanent residency abroad. It could be issued to persons who had no unsettled obligations before the Polish state, various Polish organizations and private persons. A "leaflet consular passport" (Polish: paszport konsularny blankietowy) was issued for Polish citizens temporarily abroad to enable their return to Poland in the case they could not use their national passport (e.g., because the latter was damaged or lost) and to Polish citizens deported from the abroad. Its validity was for the time required for return, but no longer than for six months.

In addition to consulates, consular passports could be issued by some other Polish state establishments of international representation, such as diplomatic missions.
