= Janos =

Janos or János may refer to:

== People ==
- János, male Hungarian given name, a variant of John
- Jánoš, Czech and Slovak surname
- James Janos (born 1951), legal birth name of Jesse Ventura
- Leo Janos (1933–2008) was an American speechwriter and ghostwriter

== Places ==
- Janos Municipality, a municipality of Chihuahua
  - Janos, Chihuahua, town in Mexico
  - Janos Biosphere Reserve, a nature reserve in Chihuahua
- Janos Trail, trade route from New Mexico to Janos

== See also ==
- Janosch (given name)
