= János =

- Pronunciation: Hungarian: [ˈjaːnoʃ]
- Gender: masculine
- Language: Hungarian
- Name day: June 26, December 27

Origin
- Language: Hebrew
- Meaning: "YHWH has been gracious"

Other names
- Variant forms: Janó, Jankó
- Nicknames: Jani, Jancsi
- Cognate: Johanan
- Anglicisation: John
- Related names: Jan, Janus, Janusz, Janosch, Ivan

János is a masculine Hungarian given name. It originates from the Hebrew name Johanan and is thus a variant of the English name John.

== People ==
Notable people with the name include:

- János Aczél (mathematician) (1924–2020), Hungarian-Canadian mathematician
- János Adorján (1938–1995), former Hungarian handball player
- János Aknai (1908–1992), Hungarian footballer
- János Arany (1817–1882), Hungarian writer, poet
- János Balogh (biologist) (1913–2002), Hungarian zoologist, ecologist, and professor
- János Balogh (chess player) (1892–1980), Hungarian–Romanian chess master
- János Balogh (footballer) (born 1982), Hungarian football goalkeeper
- Janos Bardi (1923–1990), journalist and writer
- János Bartl (1878–1958), magic supply dealer
- János Batsányi (1763–1845), Hungarian poet
- János Bédl (1929–1987), Hungarian football manager
- János Bencze (basketball) (1934–2014), Hungarian basketball player
- János Bergou (born 1947), Hungarian physicist and academic
- János Beszteri-Balogh (1938–2024), former Hungarian ice hockey player
- János Bethlen (1613–1678), Chancellor of Transylvania
- János Bihari (1764–1827), Hungarian Romani violinist
- János Biri (1901–1983), Hungarian footballer and coach
- János Bódi (born 1932), Hungarian modern pentathlete
- János Bogár (born 1964), Hungarian ultramarathon runner
- János Bognár (1914–2004), Hungarian cyclist
- János Bókai (1822–1884), Hungarian professor, pediatrician, and children's hospital director
- János Boldóczki (1912–1988), Hungarian politician
- János Bolyai (1802–1860), Hungarian mathematician
- János Borsó (born 1953), Hungarian international football player
- János Börzsei (1921–2007), former Hungarian footballer
- János Brenner (1931–1957), Hungarian Roman Catholic priest
- János Bud (1880–1950), Hungarian politician
- János Csák (born 1962), Hungarian corporate leader and ambassador
- János Csank (born 1946), former goalkeeper and football manager
- János Cserni (born 1971), Hungarian judge and journalist
- János Cseszneky (1535-1593), Hungarian magnate
- János Csík (born 1946), Hungarian handball player and handball coach
- János Czetz (1822–1904), prominent Hungarian freedom fighter
- János Dalmati (1942–2020), Hungarian racewalker
- Janos Delacruz (born 1985), Filipino painter, illustrator, etcher, and printmaker
- János Derzsi (born 1954), Hungarian actor
- János Dévai (1940–2006), Hungarian cyclist
- János Donát (1744–1830), German-born Hungarian painter
- János Dosztály (1920–1998), Hungarian sports shooter
- János Drágffy (?-1526), Judge Royal of the Kingdom of Hungary
- János Drapál (1948–1985), Grand Prix motorcycle road racer from Budapest
- János Dudás (1911–1979), Hungarian football midfielder
- János Dzvonyár (born 1961), Hungarian swimmer
- János Eilingsfeld (born 1991), Hungarian basketball player
- János Erdei (1919–1997), Hungarian boxer
- János Farkas (1741–1788), Hungarian jurist, lawyer and landowner
- János Farkas (1774–1847), Hungarian nobleman, jurist, landowner, vice-ispán
- János Farkas (footballer, born 1984), Hungarian football player
- János Fuzik (1957–2022), Hungarian journalist and politician
- János Garay (fencer) (1889–1945), Hungarian Olympic champion saber fencer
- János Kádár (1912-1989), Hungarian communist leader
- Janos Mohoss (1936–2020), Swiss fencer
- János Murányi (born 1944), Hungarian discus thrower
- János Neumann (John von Neumann) (1903–1957), Hungarian born American mathematician, computer scientist
- Janos Pasztor (diplomat) (born 1955), Hungarian diplomat
- Janos Prohaska (1919–1974), actor and stuntman
- János Rácz (1941–2023), Hungarian basketball player
- Janos Ruthaly (1875–1963), American light heavyweight boxing champion, better known as "Jack Root"
- János Scholz (1903–1993), Hungarian-born American cellist and art collector
- Janos Spiegel (1876–1956), Hungarian violin maker
- János Starker (1924–2013), Hungarian-American cellist
- Janos Sztipanovits (born 1946), electrical engineer and computer scientist
- János Uzsoki (born 1972), Hungarian long jumper

== Characters ==
- Janos Audron, introduced in the 1996 game Blood Omen
- Háry János, protagonist of Kodaly's opera Háry János (the given name, Janos, comes after the surname)
- Janos Prohaska, Blackhawk in the DC Comics universe
- Janos Rukh, a character in the 1936 film The Invisible Ray
- Janos Skorzeny, a vampire in the 1972 television film The Night Stalker
- Janos Skorzeny, a werewolf in the 1987–1988 television series Werewolf
- Janos Slynt, Commander of the City Watch in George Martin's A Song of Ice and Fire
