= Janusz =

Male given name

- Pronunciation: Polish: [ˈjanuʂ]
- Gender: Male
- Language: Polish

Origin
- Region of origin: Poland

Other names
- Related names: Jan, Janus, János, Janosch

Janusz is a masculine Polish given name and a surname. It is a Polish form of the Latin name Johannes.

== Given name ==
=== Politicians ===
- Janusz I of Warsaw (c. 1340–1429), Duke of Warsaw
- Janusz III of Masovia (1502–1526), Polish duke of Masovia
- Janusz Aleksander Sanguszko (1712–1775), Polish-Lithuanian Commonwealth magnate
- Janusz Bugajski (1954–2025), American political scientist and international relations scholar
- Janusz Chwierut (born 1965), Polish politician
- Janusz Dobrosz, Polish politician
- Janusz Jędrzejewicz (1885–1951), Polish politician and educator
- Janusz Kaczmarek (born 1961), Polish lawyer, prosecutor and politician
- Janusz Kiszka (1600–1653), Polish-Lithuanian politician and magnate
- Janusz Kochanowski (1940–2010), Polish lawyer and diplomat
- Janusz Kołodziej (politician) (born 1959), Polish politician
- Janusz Korwin-Mikke (born 1942), Polish conservative liberal political commentator and politician
- Janusz Krasoń (born 1956), Polish politician
- Janusz Leon Wiśniewski (born 1954), Polish scientist and writer
- Janusz Lewandowski (born 1951), Polish economist and politician
- Janusz Maksymiuk (born 1947), Polish politician
- Janusz Onyszkiewicz (born 1937), Polish mathematician, alpinist and politician
- Janusz Ostrogski (1554–1620), Polish-Lithuanian noble
- Janusz Palikot (born 1964), Polish politician, activist and businessman
- Janusz Pałubicki (born 1948), Polish politician and activist
- Janusz Radziwiłł (1579–1620), Polish nobleman
- Janusz Radziwiłł (1612–1655), Polish-Lithuanian noble and magnate
- Janusz Radziwiłł (1880–1967), Polish nobleman and politician
- Janusz Reiter (born 1952), Polish diplomat
- Janusz Śniadek (born 1955), Polish politician
- Janusz Suchywilk (c. 1310–1382), Polish nobleman
- Janusz Tazbir (1927–2016), Polish historian
- Janusz Tomaszewski (born 1956), Polish politician
- Janusz Tyszkiewicz Łohojski, Polish-Lithuanian Commonwealth magnate and politician
- Janusz Wiśniowiecki, starost of Krzemieniec
- Janusz Wojciechowski (born 1954), Polish politician
- Janusz Zabłocki (1926–2014), Polish politician, publicist, Catholic activist, lawyer and soldier of Armia Krajowa
- Janusz Zemke (born 1949), Polish politician
- Janusz Ziółkowski (1924–2000), Polish sociologist and politician

=== Sportsmen ===
- Janusz Brzozowski (handballer) (born 1951), Polish handball player
- Janusz Cegliński (born 1949), Polish basketball player
- Janusz Centka, Polish glider pilot
- Janusz Dziedzic (born 1980), Polish football striker
- Janusz Gol (born 1985), Polish football midfielder
- Janusz Gortat (1948–2023), Polish boxer
- Janusz Jojko (born 1960), Polish footballer
- Janusz Karweta (born 1988), Polish pair skater
- Janusz Kołodziej (speedway rider) (born 1984), Polish speedway rider
- Janusz Kupcewicz (1955–2022), Polish football player
- Janusz Krawczyk, Polish luger
- Janusz Krężelok (born 1974), Polish cross country skier
- Janusz Kudyba (born 1961), Polish football striker
- Janusz Kulig (1969–2004), Polish rally driver
- Janusz Kusociński (1907–1940), Polish athlete
- Janusz Majewski (fencer) (1940–2025), Polish Olympic fencer
- Janusz Michallik (born 1966), Polish-born retired soccer defender and current coach
- Janusz Patrzykont (1912–1982), Polish basketball player
- Janusz Pyciak-Peciak (born 1949), Polish modern pentathlete
- Janusz Sałach (born 1957), Polish cyclist
- Janusz Sidło (1933–1993), Polish javelin thrower
- Janusz Ślązak (1907–1985), Polish rower
- Janusz Sybis (born 1952), Polish football striker
- Janusz Trzepizur (born 1959), Polish high jumper
- Janusz Turowski (born 1961), Polish football coach and former player
- Janusz Waluś (born 1953), Polish ski jumper
- Janusz Wojnarowicz (born 1980), Polish judoka
- Janusz Wolański (born 1979), Polish football midfielder

=== Other ===
- Janusz Akermann (born 1957), Polish painter
- Janusz Bardach, Polish gulag survivor and physician
- Janusz Bielański, Roman Catholic priest
- Janusz Bojarski (born 1956), Polish general
- Janusz Bokszczanin (1894–1973), Polish Army colonel
- Janusz Brzozowski (1935–2019), Polish-Canadian computer scientist
- Janusz Christa (1934–2008), Polish author of comic books
- Janusz Domaniewski (1891–1954), Polish ornithologist
- Janusz Gajos, Polish actor
- Janusz Gaudyn (1935–1984), Polish physician, writer and poet
- Janusz Głowacki (1938–2017), Polish-American author and screenwriter
- Janusz Grabowski (born 1955), Polish mathematician
- Janusz Janowski (born 1965), Polish painter, jazz drummer and art theorist
- Janusz Jasiński (1928–2026), Polish historian
- Janusz Kamiński (born 1959), Polish cinematographer and film director
- Janusz Korczak (Henryk Goldszmit), Polish-Jewish children's author, pediatrician, and child pedagogist
- Janusz Kurtyka (born 1960), Polish historian specializing in the culture and religion of Poland in the 16th and 17th centuries
- Janusz Liberkowski (born 1953), winner of American Inventor season one
- Janusz Magnuski (1933–1999), Polish author and military historian
- Janusz Majewski (director) (1931–2024), Polish film director
- Janusz Meissner (1901–1978), Polish Air Force pilot, journalist and author
- Janusz Olejniczak (1952–2024), Polish classical pianist
- Janusz Paluszkiewicz (1912–1990), Polish actor
- Janusz Pasierb (1929–1993), Polish catholic priest, poet, writer, and historian
- Janusz Pawliszyn (born 1954), Polish chemist
- Janusz Pawłowski (born 1959), Polish judoka
- Janusz Piekałkiewicz (1925–1988), Polish underground soldier, historian, writer, and television/cinema director and producer
- Janusz Sanocki (1954–2020), Polish politician
- Janusz Skumin Tyszkiewicz, Lithuanian writer
- Janusz Spyra (born 1958), Polish historian specializing in Cieszyn Silesia
- Janusz Szpotański (1929–2001), Polish writer and chess player
- Janusz Szrom (born 1968), Polish jazz vocalist and composer
- Janusz Waluś (born 1953), Polish assassin
- Janusz Witwicki (1903–1946), Polish architect and art historian
- Janusz Wójcik (1953–2017), Polish politician, and former football player and coach
- Janusz Zajdel (1938–1985), Polish science-fiction author
- Janusz Zakrzeński (1936–2010), Polish actor
- Janusz Andrzej Zakrzewski (1932–2008), Polish physicist
- Janusz Zalewski (1903–1944), Polish sailor
- Janusz K. Zawodny (1921–2012), Polish-American historian, political scientist, and former World War II resistance fighter and soldier
- Janusz Zaorski (born 1947), Polish film director, scenarist and actor
- Janusz Żurakowski, Polish-born fighter and test pilot

== Surname ==
- Aleksandra Janusz (born 1980), Polish writer, and neurobiologist
- Edmund Janusz (1928–2009), Polish officer of the Citizens' Militia
- Ewald Janusz (1940–2017), Polish sprint canoer
- Marcin Janusz (born 1994), Polish volleyball player

== See also ==
- Janusz (stereotype)
- Janusz, Łódź Voivodeship, Poland
