= Janus (given name) =

Male given name

- Pronunciation: English: /ˈdʒænəs/ Polish: [ˈjanus]
- Gender: Male

Other names
- Related names: Jan, Janusz, János, Janosch, Jens, Johannes

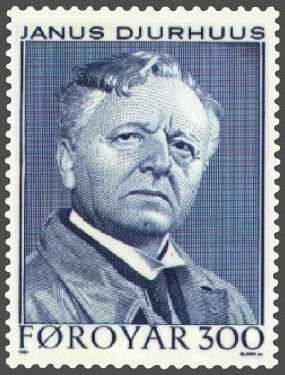
Janus Djurhuus on a Faroese stamp.

Janus is a masculine given name of Latin origin. Janus is the Roman god of beginnings, gates, transitions, time, duality, doorways, passages and endings. In January 2015, 1,305 Danes had the name Janus, according to Statistics Denmark.

== People ==
Notable people with the name include:

- Janus, King of Cyprus (1375 –1432) king of cyprus and titular King of Armenian Cilicia and Jerusalem
- Janus Adams (born 1947), American journalist, historian and radio presenter
- Janus Braspennincx (1903–1977), Dutch cyclist
- Janus Cornarius (c. 1500–1558), Saxon humanist and classical philologist
- Janus la Cour (1837–1909), Danish painter
- Janus Henricus Donker Curtius (1813–1879), Dutch businessman and diplomat
- Janus Djurhuus (1881–1948), Faroese poet
- Janus Dousa (1545–1604), Dutch statesman, jurist, historian, poet, philologist and librarian
- Janus Drachmann (born 1988), Danish footballer
- Janus Friis (born 1976), Danish entrepreneur
- Janus August Garde (1823–1893), Danish politician and Governor-General of the Danish West Indies
- Janus Genelli (1761–1813), German painter
- Janus van der Gijp (1921–1988), Dutch footballer
- Janus Guðlaugsson (born 1955), Icelandic footballer and coach
- Janus Hellemons (1912–1999), Dutch cyclist
- Janus Kamban (1913–2009), Faroese sculptor
- Janus Lauritz Andreas Kolderup-Rosenvinge (1792–1850), Danish jurist and legal historian
- Janus Lascaris (c. 1445–1535), Greek scholar in the Renaissance
- Janus Lernutius (1545–1619), Latin poet from the Habsburg Netherlands
- Janus van Merrienboer (1894–1947), Dutch archer
- Janus Ooms (1866–1924), Dutch rower
- Janus Pannonius (1434–1472), Croat-Hungarian Latinist, poet, diplomat and Bishop of Pécs
- Janus Metz Pedersen (born 1974), Danish film director
- Janus del Prado (born 1984), Filipino actor
- Janus Robberts (born 1979), South African athlete
- Janus Daði Smárason (born 1995), Icelandic handball player
- Janus Theeuwes (1886–1975), Dutch archer
- Janus van der Zande (1924–2016), Dutch marathon runner

== See also ==
- Janusz
