= Bokai =

Bokai is a Chinese name or a Hungarian surname. Notable people with the surname include:

== Chinese name ==
- Huang Bokai (born 1996), Chinese pole vaulter
- Yang Bokai, Chinese activist

== Hungarian surname ==
The old Hungarian surname may be spelled Bókai or Bókay. It is a toponymic surname indicating the origination from Bóka.

- János Bókai Sr. (né Bock, 1822–1884) doctor
- János Bókay Jr. (né Bókai, 1858–1937) doctor
- János Bókay (writer), Hungarian writher
