= Pasierb =

Pasierb is a surname which means "stepson" in Polish. Notable people with the surname include:

- Janusz Pasierb (1929–1993), Polish Catholic priest and writer
