= János Bókai =

- János Bókai Sr. (né Bock, 1822–1884) doctor
- János Bókay Jr. (né Bókai, 1858–1937) doctor
- János Bókay (writer), Hungarian writher
