= Stanisław Derehajło =

Polish government official, teacher and farmer (born 1972)

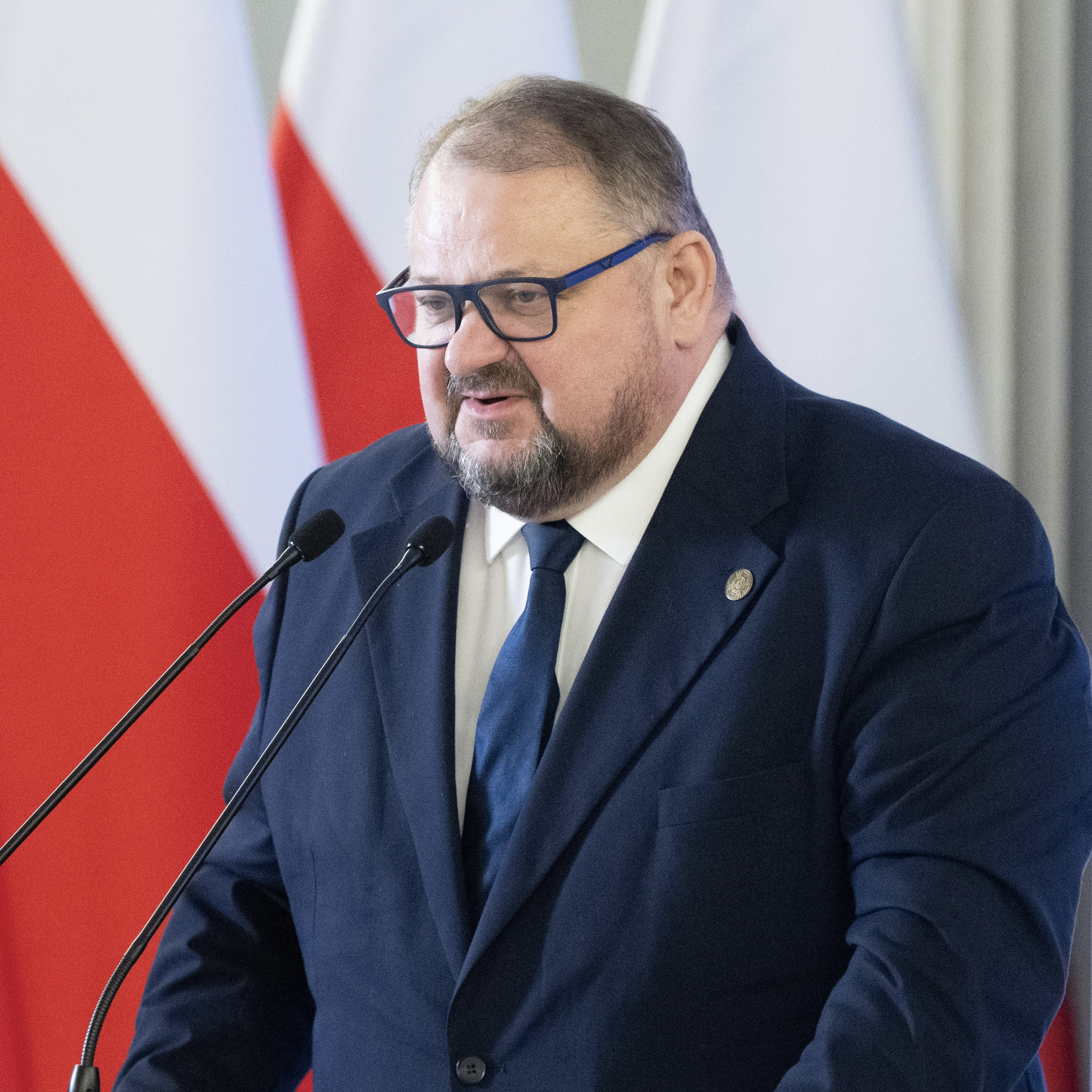

Vice Marshal of the Podlaskie Voivodeship Sejmik
- In office 2018–2021

Wójt of Gmina Boćki
- In office 1998–2017
- Preceded by: Julian Baran
- Succeeded by: Dorota Kędra-Ptaszyńska

Personal details
- Born: 23 March 1972 (age 54) Bielsk Podlaski, Polish People's Republic
- Citizenship: Poland
- Party: Confederation Liberty and Independence
- Other political affiliations: Conservative People's Party
- Education: University of Białystok
- Occupation: Farmer, politician
- Awards: Medal for Merit in Fire Protection

Stanisław Derehajło (born March 23, 1972 in Bielsk Podlaski) is a Polish local government official, teacher and farmer, in 1998–2017 Wójt (mayor) of the Boćki Commune, in 2018–2021 vice-marshal of the Podlaskie Voivodeship, then until 2022 acting vice-marshal of the Podlaskie Voivodeship. In 2017–2021 secretary general, in 2021–2023 vice-president, in 2023 chairman of the national convention and acting president of the Agreement, and from 2023 member of the Confederation.

== Biography ==
A graduate of the School Complex No. 4 in Bielsk Podlaski and historical studies at the University of Białystok. He also studied postgraduate studies in the field of EU funds management, education management, creative education and sociotherapy. He worked as a history teacher, rising to the rank of a tenured teacher. He started running his own agricultural and agritourism farm, as well as an apiary. He became a member of the folklore group "Podlaskie Kukułki" from Bielsk Podlaski, and then for 20 years he led the group "Klekociaki" from Boćki. He was also active as a volunteer firefighter, became a comrade of the Volunteer Fire Department in Boćki and treasurer of the Podlaskie provincial branch of the OSP.

In the years 1998–2017 he held the position of Wójt (mayor) of the Boćki Commune. In 2002, 2006, 2010 and 2014 he was elected to this position in the first round on behalf of local committees, since 2003 representing the Christian Democratic association Nasze Podlasie. In April 2017, he resigned from his position as mayor, taking up the position of advisor to Deputy Prime Minister Jarosław Gowin. He also became advisor to the director of the Institute of Scientific and Academic Computer Network and head of the Contact Center of the National Educational Network.

In April 2003, he was elected chairman of the political council of the Conservative People's Party - Movement of New Poland in the Podlaskie Voivodeship. In December of the same year, the party dissolved, after which he remained non-partisan, after a few years joining the reactivated SKL, where he was a proxy for the Podlaskie Voivodeship and a member of the national board. In March 2014, together with the party, he joined Poland Together, and sat on the national board of the group. In June 2017, he became acting secretary general of the party, and after its transformation in November of the same year into the agreement, he became the party's secretary general, and was also appointed as the party's proxy in the Podlaskie Voivodeship. In 2018, he obtained the mandate of a councilor of the Podlaskie Voivodeship Sejmik of the 6th term, running from the Law and Justice list (as part of the electoral agreement). On 11 December 2018, he took up the position of Vice-Marshal of the Podlaskie Voivodeship. On 18 February 2019, the Podlaskie Regional Assembly accepted the resignation of Marshal Artur Kosicki, and consequently of the entire voivodeship executive board, and then re-elected the board in the same composition, appointing Derehajło again as Vice-Marshal of the Podlaskie Voivodeship. In August 2020, he was appointed to the position of president of the district structures of the Jarosław Gowin Agreement in the Podlaskie Voivodeship. In June 2021, during the party congress, he was elected vice-president of Agreement. On October 15, 2021, at the request of Marshal Artur Kosicki, he was dismissed from the position of vice-marshal. In accordance with the provisions of the Act on Provincial Self-Government, he performed his duties due to the vacancy of the position until March 3, 2022, when the regional assembly elected Sebastian Łukaszewicz as vice-marshal of the province. In the same year, he stopped being a member of the PiS councilors' club in the regional assembly. At the turn of August and September 2023, he became the chairman of the national convention of Agreement and acting president of the party after the resignation of the head of its national convention, Iwona Michałek, and the president, Magdalena Sroka, and ran for the Sejm from the Confederation list. Running from 5th place on the list in the Podlaskie district, he won 3,568 votes (second result on the list in the district), without obtaining a mandate. In 2024, he was re-elected in the elections to the Podlaskie Voivodeship Assembly.

In 2009, he received the Bronze Badge of Merit for Fire Protection.

In 2021, he became the face of internet memes presenting the so-called Polish business Janusz. In 2023, he announced that he would take legal action against people who make money from using memes with his image without his consent.
