= Liptovský Mikuláš =

- Municipality
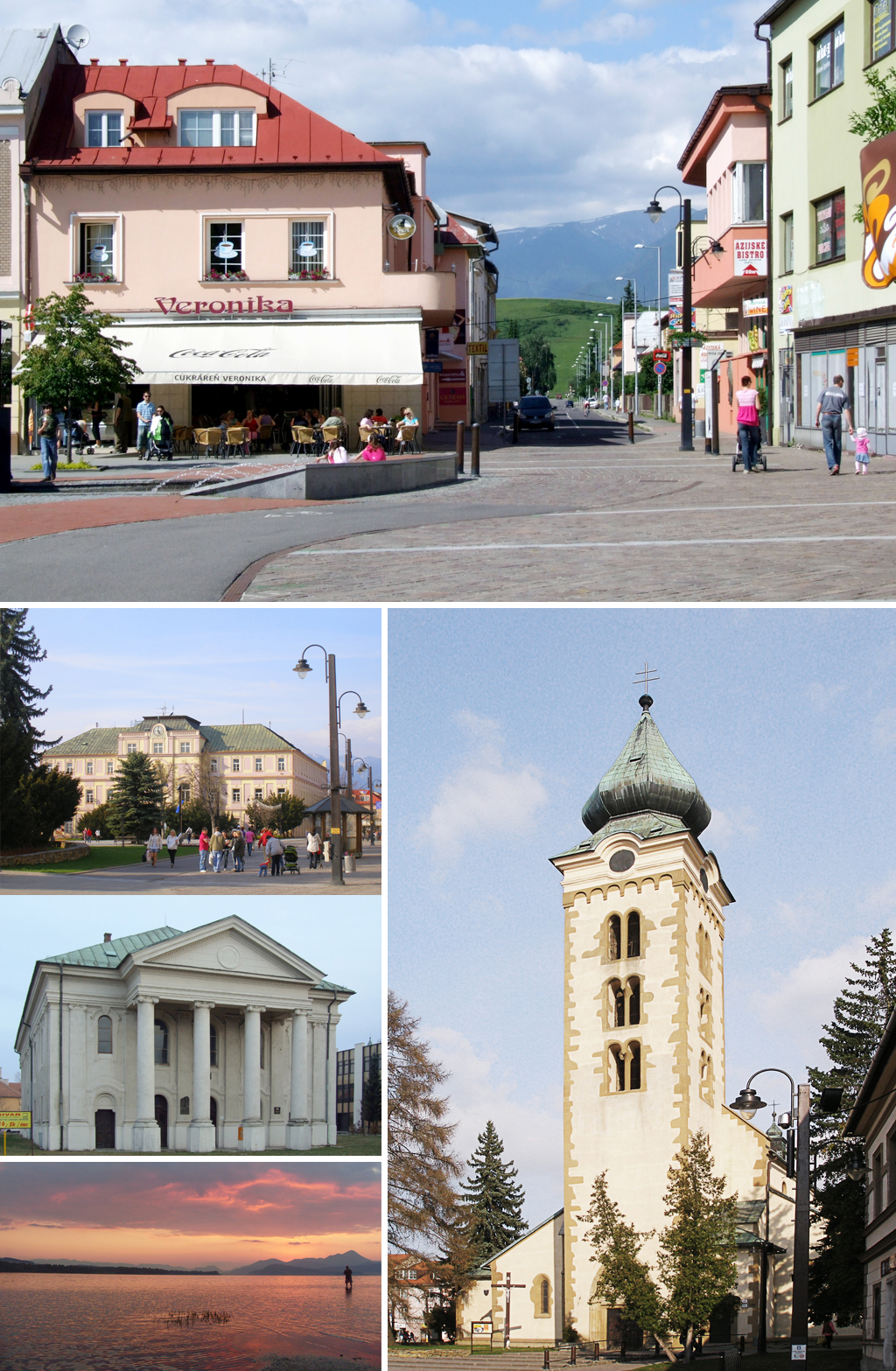
- Pictures from the top clockwise: Pedestrian zone and the market square; Gothic church of St. Nicolaus; Sunset by the Liptovská Mara lake; Synagogue in Liptovský Mikuláš; Town hall in the city center

- Flag Coat of arms
- Etymology: St. Nicholas (church) in Liptov
- Location of Liptovský Mikuláš in the Žilina Region Location of Liptovský Mikuláš in Slovakia
- Coordinates: 49.08°N 19.60°E
- Country: Slovakia
- Region: Žilina Region
- District: Liptovský Mikuláš District
- First mentioned: 1286

Government
  - Mayor: Ján Blcháč

Area
  - Total: 69.97 km^{2} (27.02 sq mi)
- Elevation: 607 m (1,991 ft)

Population (2025)
  - Total: 29,710
- Time zone: UTC+1 (CET)
  - Summer (DST): UTC+2 (CEST)
- Postal code: 031 01
- Area code: +421 44
- Vehicle registration plate (until 2022): LM
- Website: www.mikulas.sk

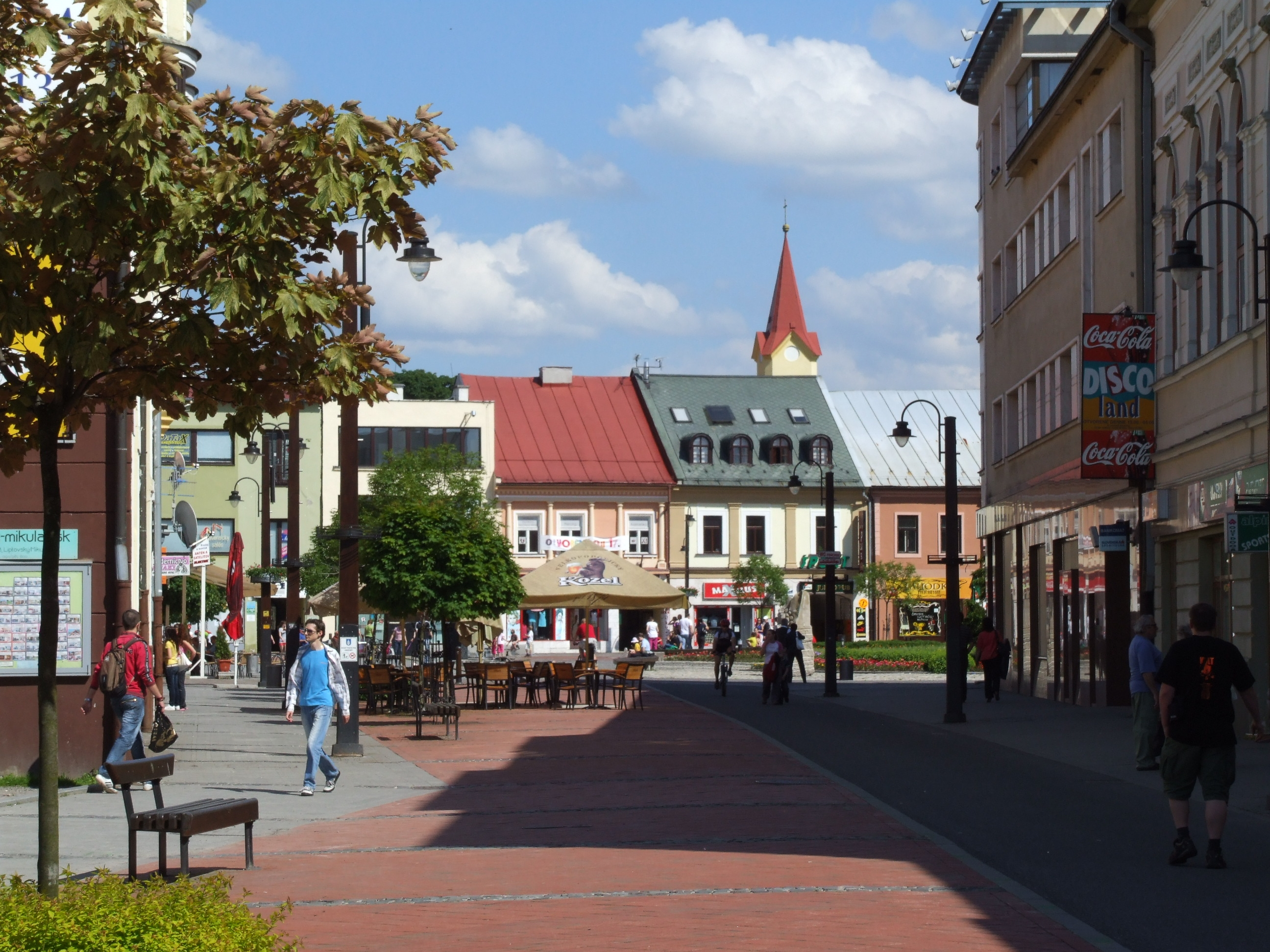
Town center of Liptovský Mikuláš

Liptovský Mikuláš (Slovak pronunciation: [ˈliptɔwskiː ˈmikulaːʂ]; until 1952 Liptovský Svätý Mikuláš, German: Liptau-Sankt-Nikolaus; Hungarian: Liptószentmiklós) is a town in northern Slovakia, on the Váh River, about 285 kilometers (177 mi) from Bratislava. It lies in the Liptov region, in Liptov Basin near the Low Tatra and Tatra Mountains. The town, known as Liptovský Svätý Mikuláš (or Liptovský Saint Nicholas) before communist times, is also renowned as a town of guilds and culture.

== Geography ==
The municipality lies at an altitude of 607 metres (1,991 ft) and covers an area of 69.97 km^{2} (27.02 sq mi) (2025).

== History ==
From the second half of the 10th century until 1918, it was part of the Kingdom of Hungary. The town of Mikuláš (Liptau-Sankt-Nikolaus) was first mentioned in the royal deed of King Ladislaus IV in 1286. The first written record mentioning the Church of Saint Nicolaus which was to become the founding element of a larger settlement dates back to 1299. The Church of Saint Nicolaus is the oldest building in the town of Liptovský Mikuláš.

Mikuláš was one of the foremost important centers of crafts in the Liptov region. The craftsmen formed guilds; the oldest guild was the shoemaker's guild mentioned in 1508. There were also other guilds: the guild of smiths, furriers, tailors, hatters and butchers.

In 1677, Liptovský Mikuláš (Liptau-Sankt-Nikolaus) became the seat of the local district, as well as Comitatus Liptoviensis. The legendary Slovak "Robin Hood" Juraj Jánošík was sentenced and executed here in 1713 by being hung by the ribcage on a hook.

Liptovský Mikuláš played an important role for Slovaks in the 19th century during the period of magyarization. It was one of the centers of Slovak national movement. The first Slovak theater, "The theater of G. F. Belopotocký" was founded there in 1830. Liptovský Mikuláš was a home to an important Slovak romantic poet and national activist, Janko Kráľ, who was fighting for the right of self-determination of Slovak nation in the Hungarian Empire. Also another national revivalist Michal Miloslav Hodža lived there. The leader of Slovak national revival, Ľudovít Štúr, publicly revealed a document called "The demands of Slovak nation" in 1848 in Liptovský Mikuláš as an official appeal to the leaders of Austrian-Hungarian empire to help solve the present existentional problems of Slovak people (unsuccessful).

Before the establishment of independent Czechoslovakia in 1918, Liptovský Mikuláš was part of Liptó County within the Kingdom of Hungary. From 1939 to 1945, it was part of the Slovak Republic.

In the 20th century, many once independent villages were annexed to Liptovský Mikuláš. Thus, what was once the bucolic farmers' hamlet of Vrbica is now simply a street in the middle of the town.

== Tourism ==
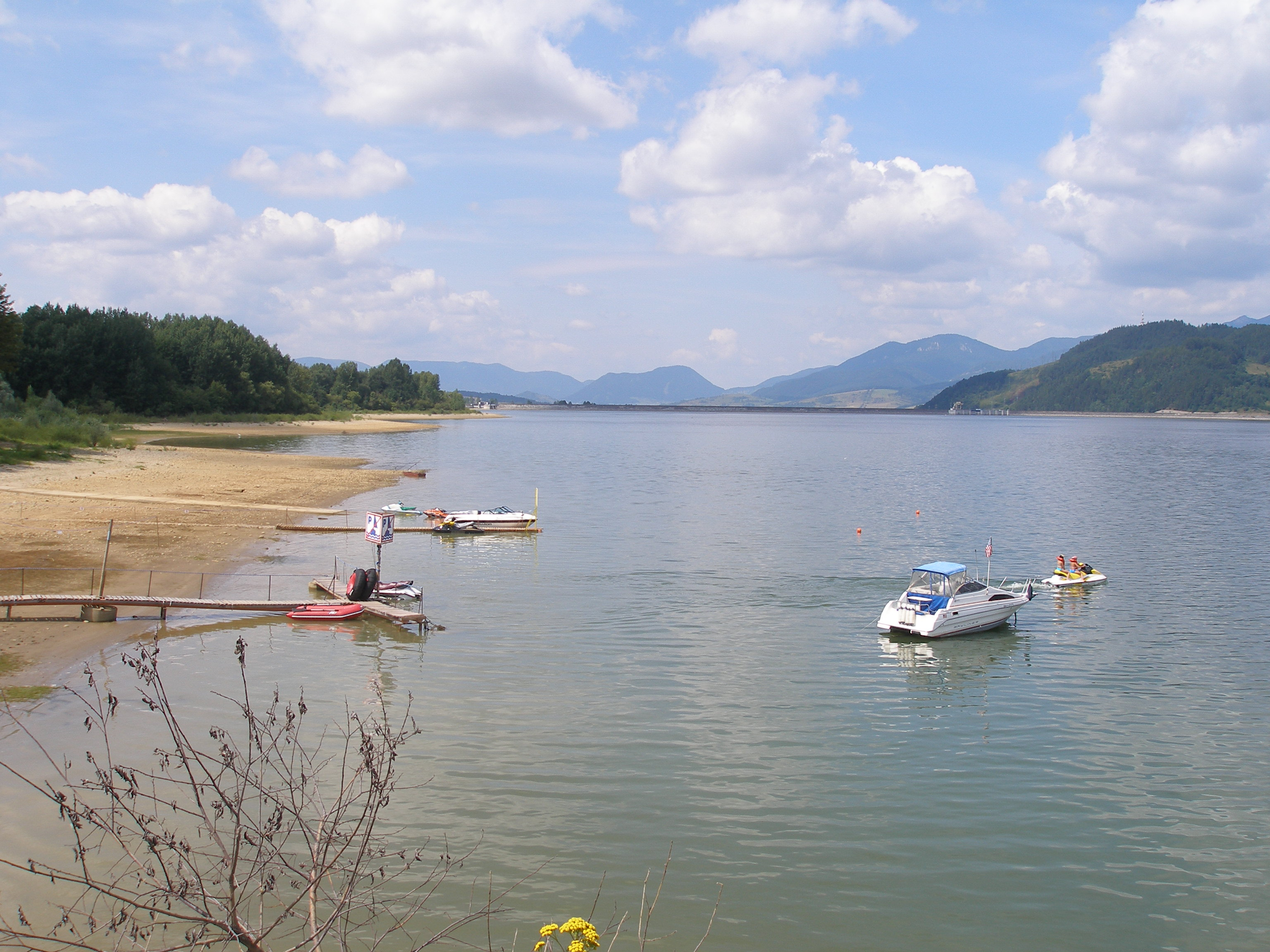
Liptovska Mara dam

The town is one of the most famous tourist centers in Slovakia because of its rich cultural life and also because it is a perfect starting point for tourists, from where it is easy to reach the Low Tatras (Demänová valley) with well-known caves such as the Demänová Ice Cave or Demänová Cave of Freedom, or to the Western Tatras. Folk architecture can also be seen nearby in Vlkolínec near Ružomberok, or Pribylina, a few kilometers west of the town, and for recreation, the lake called Liptovská Mara is available. Since 2004 a new aquapark called Aquapark Tatralandia has been open. The area is also well-known due to its location close to the biggest ski resort in Slovakia, Jasná.

== Population ==
Historical population
Year	Pop.	±%
1970	20,038	—
1980	24,520	+22.4%
1991	31,725	+29.4%
2001	33,007	+4.0%
2011	31,921	−3.3%
2021	30,522	−4.4%
Source: Censuses

Population statistic (10 years)
Year	1995	2005	2015	2025
Count	33,597	32,884	31,534	29,710
Difference		−2.12%	−4.10%	−5.78%

Population statistic
Year	2024	2025
Count	29,860	29,710
Difference		−0.50%

It has a population of 29,710 people (31 December 2025).

According to the Hungarian census of 1910, the population make up was 50% Slovak, 30% Hungarian 20% German. After World War II, the ethnic minorities were expelled leaving a majority Slovak population.

=== Ethnicity ===
Census 2021 (1+ %)
Ethnicity	Number	Fraction
Slovak	27,847	91.23%
Not found out	2160	7.07%
Czech	555	1.81%
Romani	415	1.35%
Total	30,522	

In year 2021 was 30,522 people by ethnicity 27,847 as Slovak, 2160 as Not found out, 555 as Czech, 415 as Romani, 110 as Hungarian, 98 as Other, 67 as Rusyn, 63 as Russian, 41 as Polish, 35 as German, 24 as Moravian, 22 as Ukrainian, 14 as Greek, 13 as English, 9 as Vietnamese, 9 as Canadian, 8 as Turkish, 8 as Italian, 8 as Austrian, 7 as Jewish, 7 as Serbian, 6 as Chinese, 5 as French, 3 as Silesian, 2 as Irish, 2 as Albanian, 1 as Croatian and 1 as Bulgarian.

Note on population: The difference values of population numbers in the table "Population statistic" and in the sections "Ethnicity" & "Religion" is caused by the use of various statistical methods.

=== Religion ===
Census 2021 (1+ %)
Religion	Number	Fraction
None	12,928	42.36%
Roman Catholic Church	8243	27.01%
Evangelical Church	5793	18.98%
Not found out	2289	7.5%
Total	30,522	

In year 2021 was 30,522 people by religion 12,928 from None, 8243 from Roman Catholic Church, 5793 from Evangelical Church, 2289 from Not found out, 259 from Jehovah's Witnesses, 256 from Greek Catholic Church, 125 from Ad hoc movements, 109 from Other, 100 from Other and not ascertained christian church, 80 from Baptists Church, 67 from Eastern Orthodox Church, 52 from Buddhism, 49 from Christian Congregations in Slovakia, 41 from Paganism and natural spirituality, 41 from United Methodist Church, 16 from Seventh-day Adventist Church, 12 from Calvinist Church, 12 from Islam, 12 from Church of the Brethren, 11 from Jewish community, 8 from Old Catholic Church, 8 from Czechoslovak Hussite Church, 6 from Hinduism and 5 from Apostolic Church.

== Sport ==
Ice hockey club HK 1932 Liptovský Mikuláš represents the city in Tipos extraliga.

The Ondrej Cibak Whitewater Slalom Course on the nearby Váh river is the oldest whitewater slalom course in Slovakia. The 2008 Olympic champion in canoe slalom, C-1, Michal Martikán was born and lives here. Also Elena Kaliská, another Olympic winner, is a member of the town sports club.

Petra Vlhová, born and raised in the city, won the alpine skiing slalom gold medal at the 2022 Winter Olympics. As a child she attended many training at a ski center at Podbreziny hill of the city. Martina Dubovská also trained at the center in her childhood. The ski center at Podbreziny was established in 1993 and was discontinued gradually in early 2010s. In 2022, it was restored and re-entered into usage. The tracks combine to a total length of 550 meters at peak altitude of 700 meters.

Liptovský Mikuláš hosted the 2012 FAI World Championship for Space Models, taking place from 31 August to 9 September.

== Transport ==
Liptovský Mikuláš is located near the main Slovak D1 motorway, as well as being on the main railroad from Bratislava to Košice. The closest international airport is in Poprad. The town also has its own public transport network with 13 lines operating.

== Twin towns – sister cities ==
Liptovský Mikuláš is twinned with:

- Annecy, France
- Bačka Palanka, Serbia
- Galanta, Slovakia
- Kalamaria, Greece
- Kemi, Finland
- Kiskőrös, Hungary
- Michalovce, Slovakia
- Opava, Czech Republic
- Terchová, Slovakia
- Żywiec, Poland
- Anzio, Italy
- Cluj-Napoca, Romania

== Climate ==
Liptovský Mikuláš has a humid continental climate (Köppen: Dfb).

Climate data for Liptovský Mikuláš
Month	Jan	Feb	Mar	Apr	May	Jun	Jul	Aug	Sep	Oct	Nov	Dec	Year
Mean daily maximum °C (°F)	−1.7 (28.9)	0.6 (33.1)	5.1 (41.2)	11.4 (52.5)	15.9 (60.6)	19.6 (67.3)	21.3 (70.3)	21.4 (70.5)	16.3 (61.3)	11.1 (52.0)	5.1 (41.2)	−0.3 (31.5)	10.5 (50.9)
Daily mean °C (°F)	−4.6 (23.7)	−2.7 (27.1)	1.0 (33.8)	6.5 (43.7)	11.1 (52.0)	14.9 (58.8)	16.5 (61.7)	16.3 (61.3)	11.5 (52.7)	6.7 (44.1)	2.1 (35.8)	−2.9 (26.8)	6.4 (43.5)
Mean daily minimum °C (°F)	−7.6 (18.3)	−6.2 (20.8)	−3.2 (26.2)	1.4 (34.5)	5.9 (42.6)	9.7 (49.5)	11.3 (52.3)	11.3 (52.3)	7.2 (45.0)	3.1 (37.6)	−0.7 (30.7)	−5.7 (21.7)	2.2 (36.0)
Average precipitation mm (inches)	63.4 (2.50)	61.9 (2.44)	60.1 (2.37)	63.5 (2.50)	106.4 (4.19)	107.0 (4.21)	118.4 (4.66)	101.0 (3.98)	82.8 (3.26)	64.2 (2.53)	59.8 (2.35)	60.5 (2.38)	949 (37.37)
Source: Weather.Directory

== People ==
- Jozef Božetech Klemens (1817), painter
- Janko Kráľ (1822), poet
- Samuel Nemessányi (1837), Hungarian luthier, a maker of stringed instruments
- Ján Levoslav Bella (1843), composer
- Aurel Stodola (1859), physicist
- Samuel Fischer (1859), publisher
- Slavoljub Eduard Penkala (1871), engineer, inventor
- Ivan Stodola (1888), poet, dramatist, doctor
- Martin Rázus (1888, Vrbica), priest, author, politician
- Janko Alexy (1894), painter
- Koloman Sokol (1902), painter
- Pavol Strauss (1912), doctor, writer, essayist, translator
- Pavel Cheben (born 1967), engineer and physicist
- Michal Martikán (born 1979), slalom canoeist
- Tomáš Mráz (born 1980), slalom canoeist
- Simon Naschér (1841–1901), rabbi, writer
- Peter Sejna (1979), AHL/NHL player
- Martin Cibák (1980), 2004 Stanley cup winner with Tampa Bay Lightning
- Milan Jurčina (1983), NHL player
- Peter Veselovský (1964–2025), ice hockey player
- Petra Vlhová (1995), ski racer
- Klaudia Medlová (1993), professional snowboarder / Olympian
- Simona Petrík (born 1982), politician, MP (2016-2020; 2023-)
- Simon Nemec (born 2004), NHL player for New Jersey Devils

== Images ==
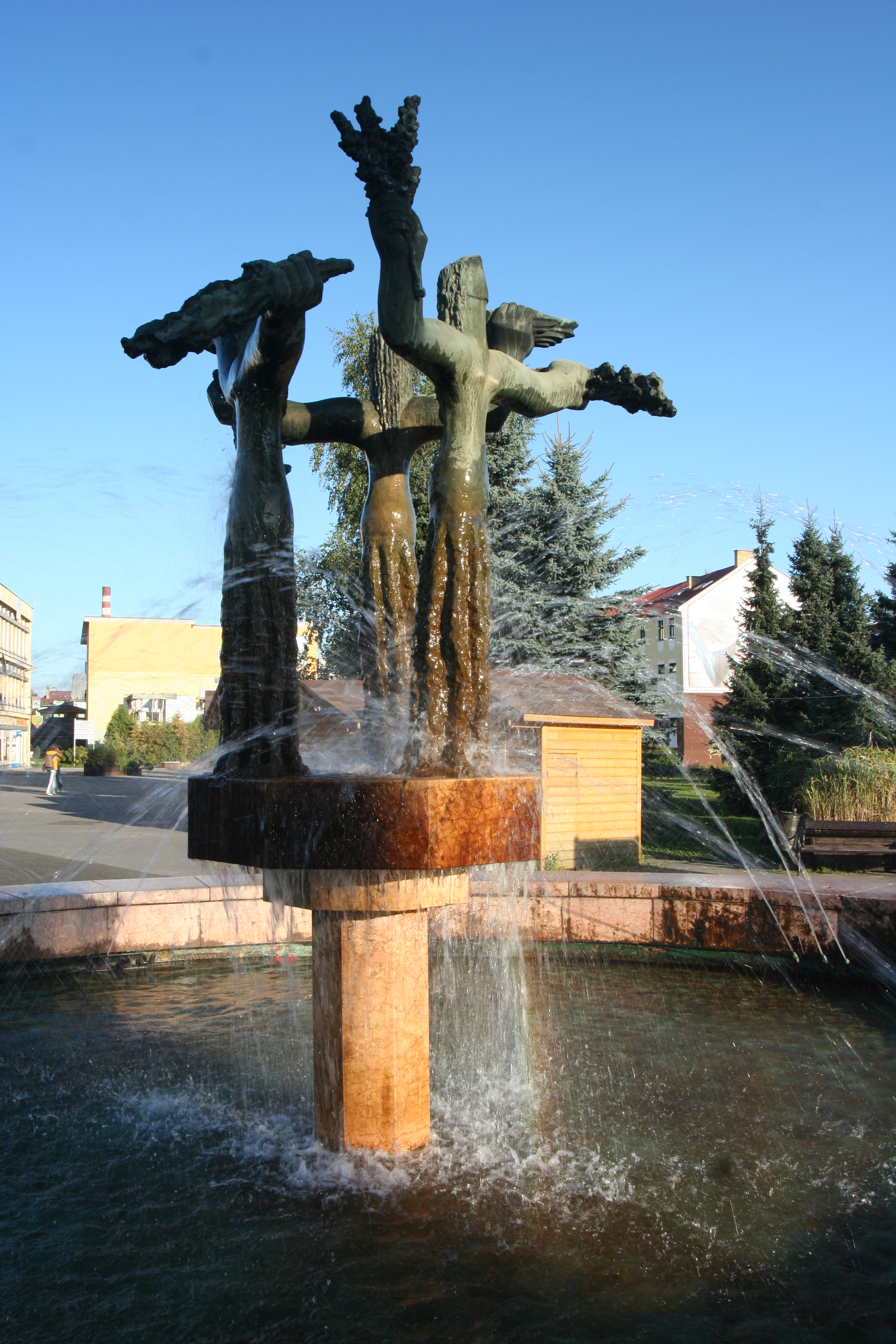
Fountain

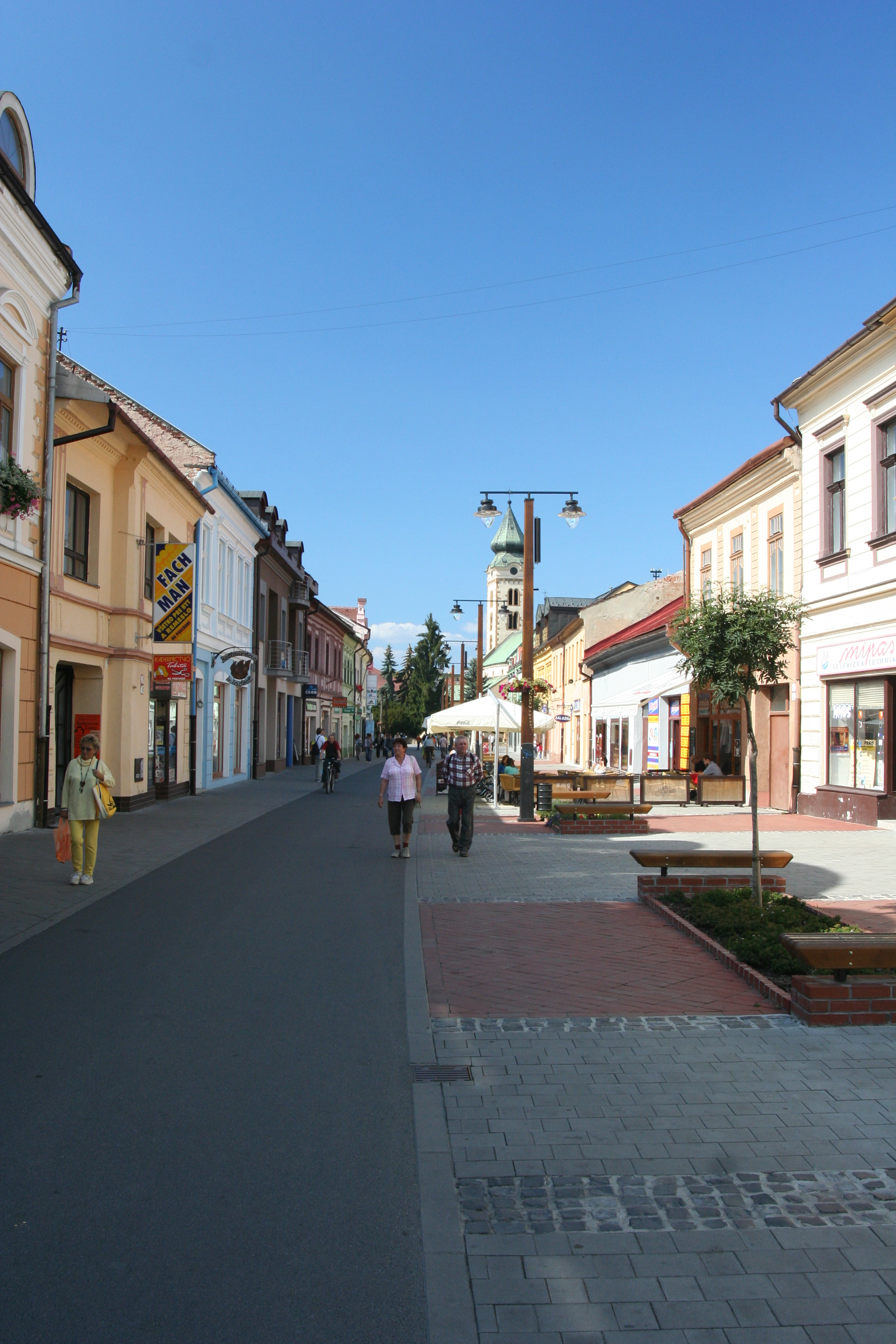
Town center

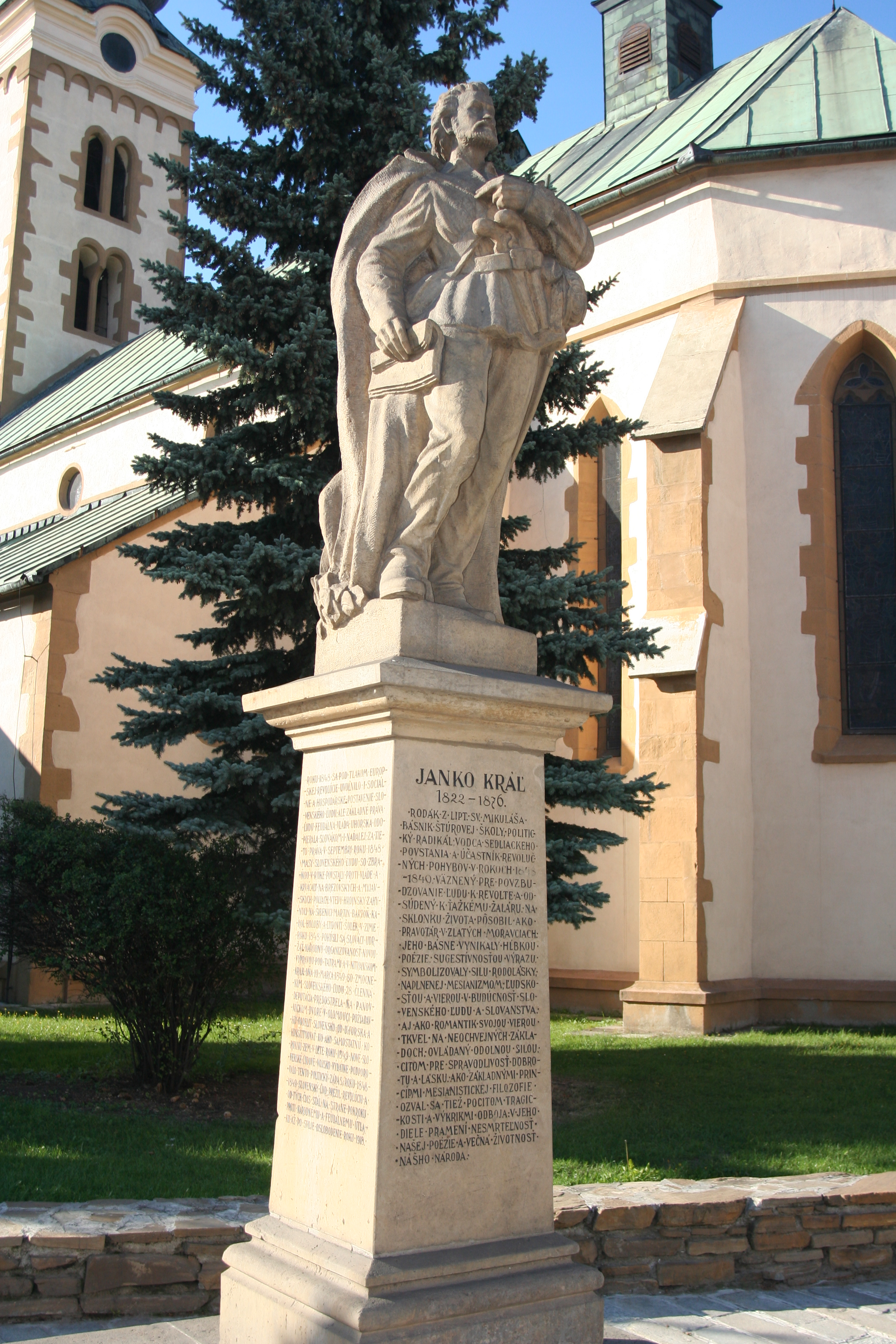
Janko Kráľ's monument.

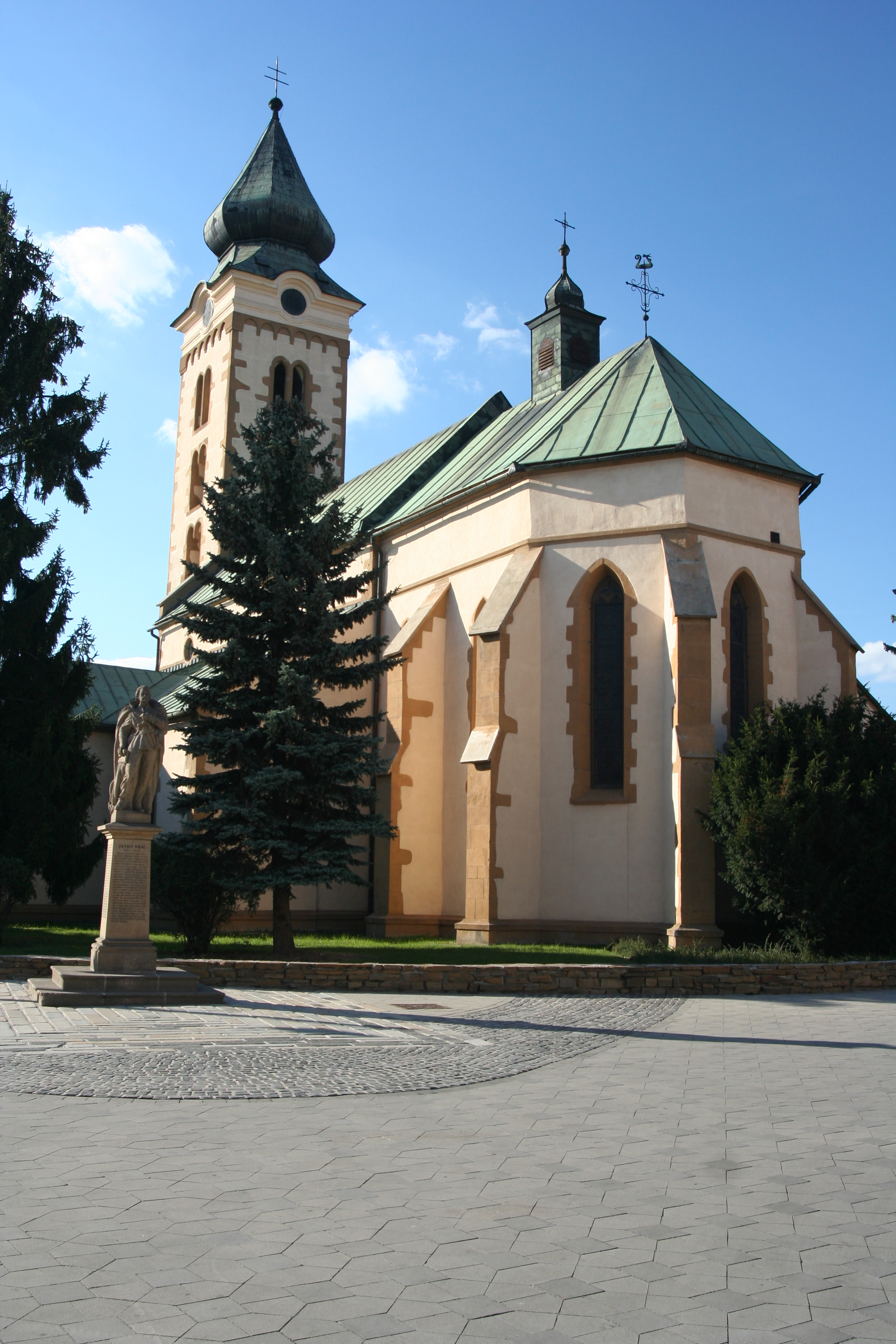
Saint Nicholas' Church

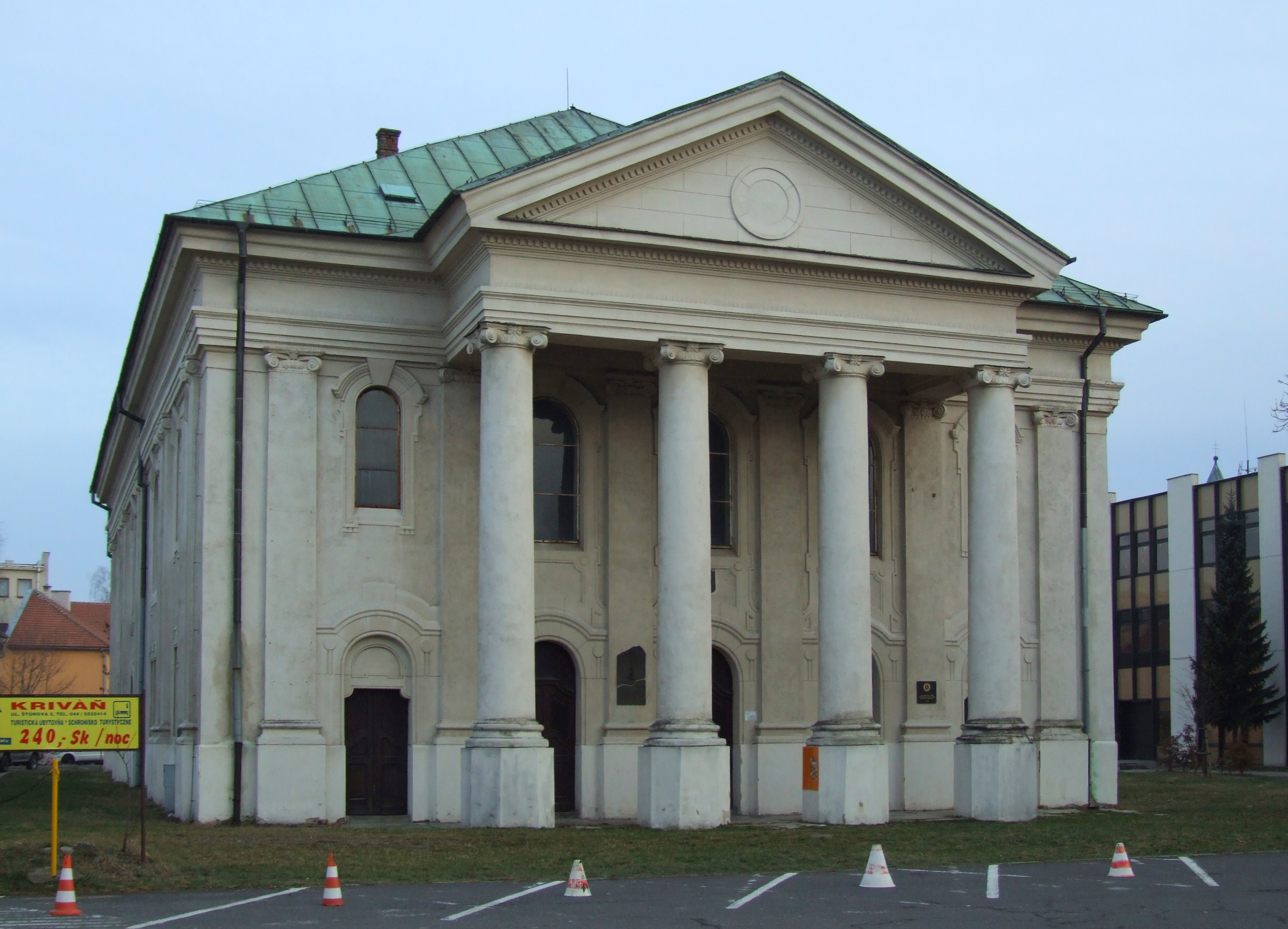
Synagogue
