= Sejm Constituency no. 24 =

Polish parliamentary constituency

Białystok
- Polish: Okręg wyborczy Białystok
- Constituency for the Sejm of Poland
- Boundary of the Białystok Constituency in Poland for the 2015 general election.
- Counties in Podlaskie Voivodeship: Augustów, Białystok, Bielsk, Grajewo, Hajnówka, Kolno, Łomża, Mońki, Sejny, Siemiatycze, Sokółka, Suwałki, Wysokie Mazowieckie and Zambrów
- City Counties in Podlaskie Voivodeship: Białystok, Łomża and Suwałki

Current constituency
- Sejm Deputies: Adam Andruszkiewicz (PiS); Jacek Bogucki (PiS); Kazimierz Gwiazdowski (PiS); Sebastian Łukaszewicz (PiS); Dariusz Piontkowski (PiS); Jacek Sasin (PiS); Jarosław Zieliński (PiS); Alicja Łepkowska-Gołaś (PO); Jacek Niedźwiedzki (PO); Krzysztof Truskolaski (PO); Szymon Hołownia (PL2050); Barbara Okuła (PL2050); Stefan Krajewski (PSL); Krzysztof Bosak (KONF)
- Sejm District: 24
- European Parliament constituency: Podlaskie and Warmian-Masurian
- Voivodeship sejmik: Podlaskie Regional Assembly

Białystok constituency (Polish: Okręg wyborczy Białystok) is a Polish parliamentary constituency that is coterminous with the Podlaskie Voivodeship. It elects fourteen members of the Sejm.

The district has the number '24', and is named after the city of Białystok. It includes the counties of Augustów, Białystok, Bielsk, Grajewo, Hajnówka, Kolno, Łomża, Mońki, Sejny, Siemiatycze, Sokółka, Suwałki, Wysokie Mazowieckie, and Zambrów and the city counties of Białystok, Łomża, and Suwałki.

== List of members ==
=== 2023–2027 ===
Member	Party
Adam Andruszkiewicz	Law and Justice
Jacek Bogucki	Law and Justice
Krzysztof Bosak	Confederation
Kazimierz Gwiazdowski	Law and Justice
Szymon Hołownia	Poland 2050
Stefan Krajewski	Polish People's Party
Alicja Łepkowska-Gołaś	Civic Platform
Sebastian Łukaszewicz	Law and Justice
Jacek Niedźwiedzki	Civic Platform
Barbara Okuła	Poland 2050
Dariusz Piontkowski	Law and Justice
Jacek Sasin	Law and Justice
Krzysztof Truskolaski	Civic Platform
Jarosław Zieliński	Law and Justice
