= Sebastian Łukaszewicz =

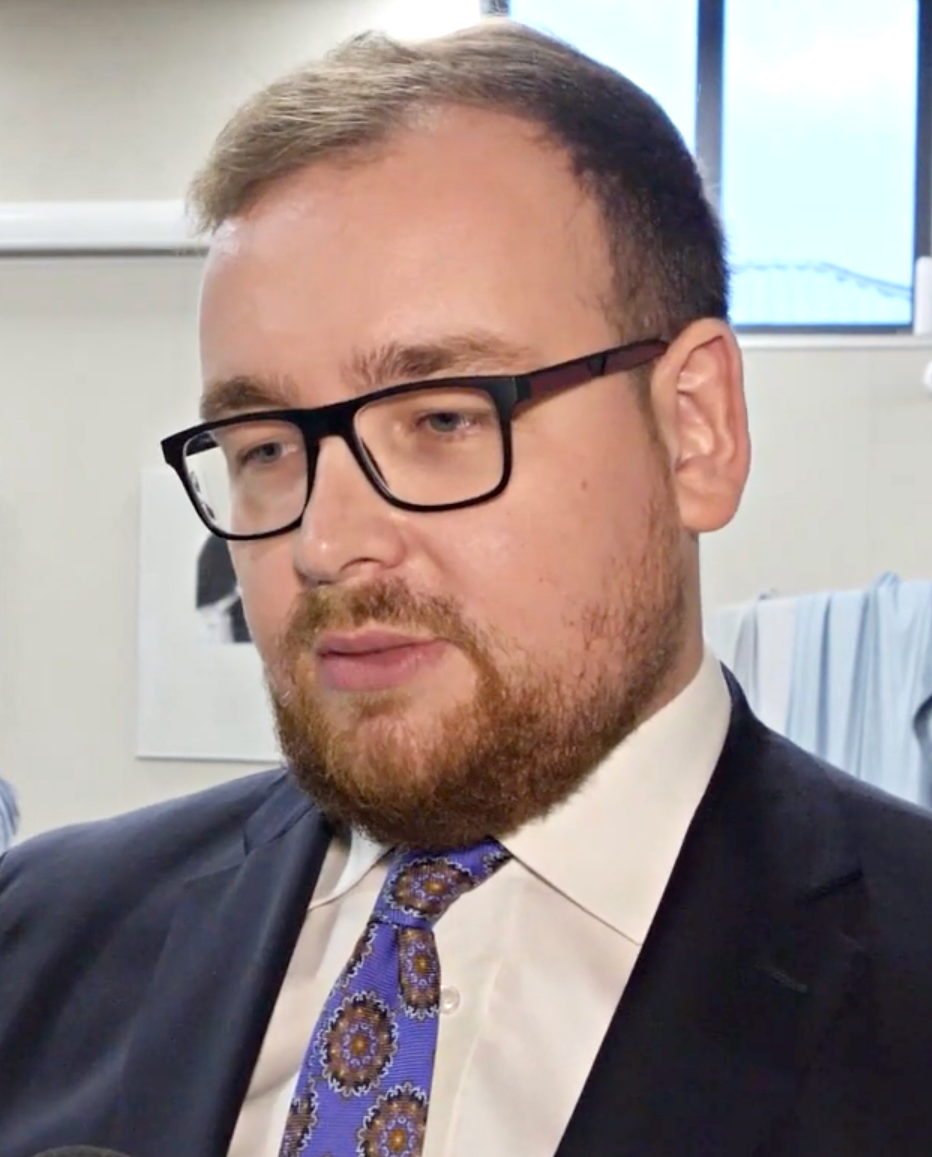

Member of the Sejm
- Incumbent
- Assumed office 12 November 2023
- Constituency: 24-Białystok

Vice-Marshal of Podlaskie Voivodeship
- In office 2022–2023

Personal details
- Born: 9 February 1991 (age 35) Białystok, Poland
- Citizenship: Poland
- Party: Law and Justice
- Education: University of Białystok
- Occupation: Politician

Sebastian Łukaszewicz (born February 9, 1991, in Białystok) is a Polish local government official and manager, in 2022–2023 vice-marshal of the Podlaskie Voivodeship. He is a member of the Sejm of the 10th term.

== Biography ==
Son of Andrzej and Elżbieta. He studied French philology with Spanish and internal security at the University of Białystok, in 2017 he obtained a bachelor's degree in the latter field. In 2020 he graduated from MBA studies at the Management Academy of Applied Sciences in Warsaw. In 2019 he became deputy director of the Białystok branch of Totalizator Sportowy, and was also a member of the boards of various institutions, including the Polish Mutual Insurance Company

He became involved in political activities within the Law and Justice party. In 2010 he ran for the Podlaskie Voivodeship Sejmik. In 2015–2018, he was an advisor to the Minister of Agriculture and Rural Development Krzysztof Jurgiel, responsible for cooperation with local governments and non-governmental organizations. In 2018, he was elected a councilor of the Podlaskie Voivodeship Sejmik of the 6th term. As a representative of Podlaskie, he joined the Committee of the Regions. In January 2020, he moved from PiS to Solidarna Polska (renamed Sovereign Poland in May 2023). On March 3, 2022, he took over as vice-marshal of the Podlaskie Voivodeship (in place of Stanisław Derehajło, dismissed in October 2021, who had been acting vice-marshal until then due to the ineffective election of a successor, at that time Sebastian Łukaszewicz was not elected vice-marshal by the regional assembly). In 2021, he was finally sentenced by the District Court in Białystok to a fine for insulting the Equality March in Białystok in 2019.

In the 2023 elections, he won the mandate of a member of the Sejm of the 10th term, running from the last place on the PiS list (as a representative of Sovereign Poland) in the Białystok district and receiving 11,554 votes. As a result, he ended his term as vice-marshal of the Podlaskie Voivodeship. In January 2024, he was appointed to the Sejm's investigative committee on the use of Pegasus software.
