= Pavol Strauss =

- Born: 30 August 1912; Liptovský Mikuláš
- Died: 3 June 1994 (81 years old); Nitra
- Occupations: Doctor, writer and philosopher
- Website: www.pavolstrauss.sk

Pavol Strauss (30 August 1912, in Liptovský Mikuláš – 3 June 1994, in Nitra); was a Slovak medical doctor, writer, essayist and translator.

== Biography ==
Strauss's autobiography, Kolíska dôvery, published in 1994, can be considered as an authentic guidebook through his remarkable life. Strauss studied at a „gymnazium“ in his birthplace, where he actively worked in the self-educational group of M. M. Hodža. After passing the „maturita“ he studied medicine in Vienna and finished his studies at the German university in Prague in 1938. From 1938 to 1939 he completed a one-year military service. He worked as a doctor in Palúdzka and Ružomberok. Strauss converted to Catholicism from Judaism after a two-year struggle in 1942. Before the war ended he had been in a concentration camp in Nováky. He subsequently worked as a surgeon in Bratislava and from 1946 to 1956 as a head surgeon in Skalica. Finally, from 1956 to 1982, he worked as a surgeon in the State hospital in Nitra.

Strauss spent his childhood and student years in the house of his grandfather, Doctor Bartolomej Kux, who was an educated, however sceptical Jew. Under his influence, young Strauss perceived God more pantheisticly, which gave him a feeling of fear and insecurity. After adolescence he had doubts about the value of the world, in which he saw severe social injustice. He saw many negative traits in a lot of his Jewish fellows, on the other hand the Judaism was enlightened by the example of Hasidic rabbis. At the end of his high school, Strauss was flirting with communism, by studying the work of Mehring, Engels, Lenin, Plechan, and Bukharin. He was under the strong influence of Breton´s and Eluard´s surrealism and poetism and dadaism as well. During his studies in Prague he was going through some enriching cultural experience, which when he looked back at, he thought of them as „...as a sticker, a band-aid for a scattered soul. The outer discomfort beyond more restless and sinful soul. The obscurity in moral viewpoints, the desire to stand out and the great hunger after the truth, the purity and the assurance, even besides the notorious social problems...“ Nevertheless, he found something in this all later and considered it as his first phase of the conversion to Christianity. He defined it as a challenge of remplacing himself for living with the others, living for the world, especially the world of future. The second phase of his conversion had started during his military service in Ružomberok, where he was very positively influenced by the converted family - „Munkovci“. They availed him of catholic literature, particularly the work of Lippert and Guardini. He excitedly read the other work of Maritain, Blondel, Gilson, Guitton, Rilke, Papini, Bergson and others. He could not have let go of the ideas of Nietzsche, Breton and of some published ideas in the magazine Psyché. In the third phase of Strauss´s conversion, starting in about 1940, he was accepting a challenge to be baptized by Jozef Kožár, which had been consecrating him into the New Testament for almost half a year. Just before the baptism he partook in the spiritual retreats under the guidance of a Jesuit Ján Dieška and eventually he completed interviews with then Jesuit provincial padre Jozef Mikuš. In the post conversion phase he strengthened his faith by reading religion literature, particularly Imitation of Christ, Filotey and by penetrating into the liturgical life of the Church. His wife Mária, maiden name: Loydlová was some kind of a spiritual manuduktor to him.

== Bibliography ==
The translations of the titles in English listed next to the original title in square brackets [...], only indicative, given that to date have not yet been officially published in the English language versions of the works of Strauss.

- Die Kanone auf dem Ei, 1936 (poems)
- Schwarze verse, 1937 (poems)
- Všetko je rovnako blízke (Kaleidoskop z cesty po Švajčiarsku) Everything is close evenly [A kaleidoscope of the journey through Switzerland], 1946
- Mozaika nádeje [Mosaic of hope], Bratislava, 1948
- Stĺpy [Columns], Ružomberok, 1948
- Aforistické diárium [Aphoristic diaries], Ružomberok, 1960
- Krížová cesta pre chorých [Stations of the Cross for the sick], Ružomberok, 1964
- Postila dneška [Today's lent], Ružomberok, 1965
- Zápisky diletanta [Amateur's memoirs], Bratislava, 1968
- Zákruty bez ciest [Curves without roads], Bratislava, 1971
- Roztrhnutá opona [A torn curtain], Ružomberok, 1972
- Rekviem za živých [Requiem for the alive], Bratislava, 1991
- Nádhera nečakaného. Úsmev nad úsmevom [The beauty of unexpected. Smile upon smile], ( Ideas and aphorisms), Bratislava, 1992
- Kvety z popola [Flowers from ashes], Martin, 1992
- Mozaika nádeje [Mosaic of hope] (extended), Bratislava, 1992
- Ecce homo, Bratislava,1992
- Tesná brána [Narrow gate], Bratislava, 1992
- A slovo zdúchal duch [And a ghost blew the word away], Bratislava, 1992
- Krížová cesta (Mozaika meditácií) [Stations of the Cross (Mosaic of meditations)], Bratislava, 1993
- Za mostom času [Beyond the bridge of time], Košice, 1993
- Kolíska dôvery [A cradle of trust], Trnava, 1994
- Odvrátený hlas. Poznámky ku všetkému i k životu [Reversed speech. Notes for everything even for life], Bratislava, 1994
- Torzo ticha [A fragment of silence], Bratislava, 1995
- Život je len jeden [Just one life], Bratislava, 1996
- Človek pre nikoho [Man for nobody], Bratislava, 2000
- Sme mocnejší než čas. Apokalyptické tiene [We are stronger than time. Apocalyptic shadows], Bratislava, 2005

Selected writings

- volume 1: S výhľadom do nekonečna [With a view of eternity], Prešov, 2010
- volume 2: Hudba plaší smrť [Music terrifies death], Prešov, 2010
- volume 3: Rekviem za neumieranie [Requiem for not dying], Prešov, 2010
- volume 4: Skalpelom a perom [By scalpel and by pen], Prešov, 2010.
- volume 5: Ozveny vnútorných hlasov [Echoes of the inner voices], Prešov, 2010.
- volume 6: Aforistické iskrenie [Aphoristic sparkles], Prešov, 2010.
- volume 7: Život je provizórium [Life is temporary] Prešov, 2011.
- volume 8: Slovenské básne [Slovak Poems], Prešov 2011.
- volume 9: Nemecké básne [German Poems], Prešov, 2011.
- volume 10: Preklady a korešpondencia [Translations and correspondence], Prešov, 2012.

== Other publications about him ==
- RYBÁK, P.: P. Strauss – The fighting bell of this era. In.: Hope and Life, 1992
- BÁTOROVÁ, M.: Paradoxes of Pavol Strauss, Bratislava, 2006
- A magazine: Letters from Pavol Strauss, Mikuláš, 2007 – 2010, no. 1–9
- WEAG, G.: Strauss - two brothers, Live AID Bratislava 2013
- LETZ, J.: Slovak Christian philosophy of 20th century and its prospects, Krakov/Trnava, 2010, p. 82–86, 96–98, 354.
