= Barbara Okuła =

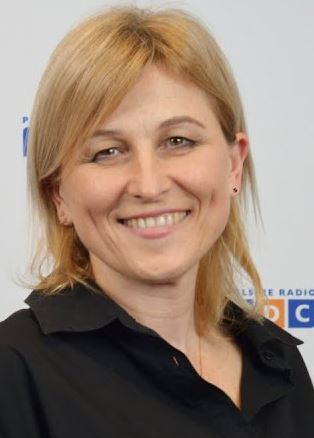

Member of the Sejm
- Incumbent
- Assumed office 12 November 2023
- Constituency: 24-Białystok

Personal details
- Born: 4 December 1973 (age 52) Siemiatycze, Polish People's Republic
- Citizenship: Poland
- Party: Poland 2050
- Other political affiliations: Third Way
- Education: Higher School of Finance and Management
- Occupation: Politician

Barbara Okuła née Trusiak (born 4 December 1973 in Siemiatycze) is a Polish politician and entrepreneur, member of the Sejm of the 10th term.

== Biography ==
Daughter of Stanisław and Teresa. She graduated in finance and accounting from the Higher School of Finance and Management in Białystok (she obtained her master's degree in 2002). She started running her own business as part of the commercial law company "Farbud", as well as a chain of toy stores. She became a member of the board of the "Białostocka Akademia Musicalowa" Foundation.

She was involved in Szymon Hołownia's presidential campaign in 2020. She joined the party Poland 2050, initiated by him. In the 2023 parliamentary elections, she ran for the Sejm from the third place on the Third Way list in the Białystok electoral district; she obtained the mandate of a member of parliament of the 10th term, receiving 3,482 votes. In 2024, on behalf of this coalition, she ran unsuccessfully in the elections to the European Parliament from district no. 3 (she received 5,785 votes).
