= Jarosław Zieliński =

Polish politician

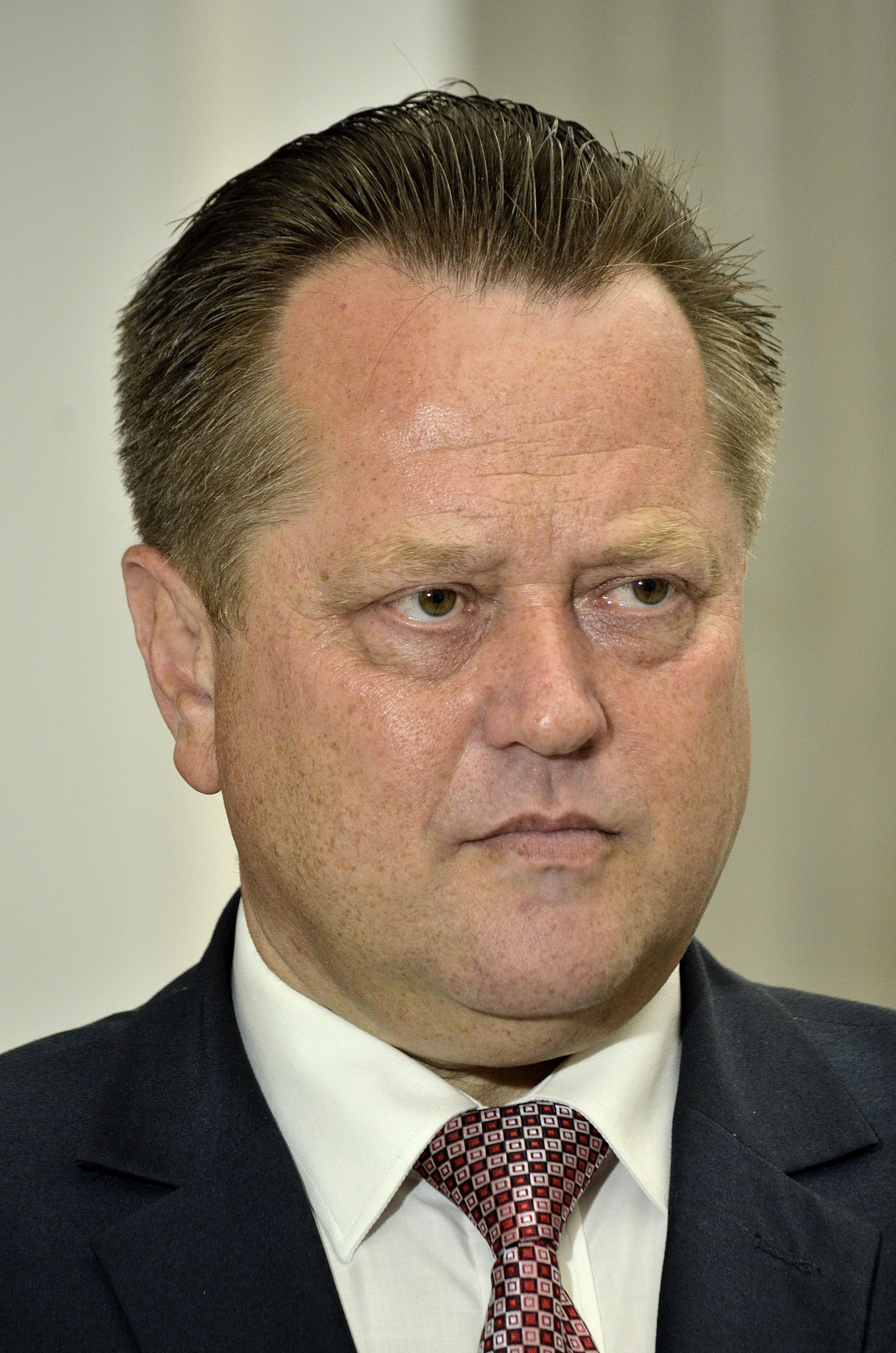

Member of the Sejm
- Incumbent
- Assumed office 25 September 2005
- Constituency: 24 – Białystok

Personal details
- Born: 1960 (age 65–66)
- Party: Law and Justice

Jarosław Zieliński (born 20 September 1960 in Szwajcaria) is a Polish politician. He was elected to the Sejm on 25 September 2005, getting 15780 votes in 24 Białystok district as a candidate from the Law and Justice list.

He was also a member of Sejm 2001-2005.

== See also ==
- Members of Polish Sejm 2005-2007
