= Janusz (stereotype) =

Polish stereotype

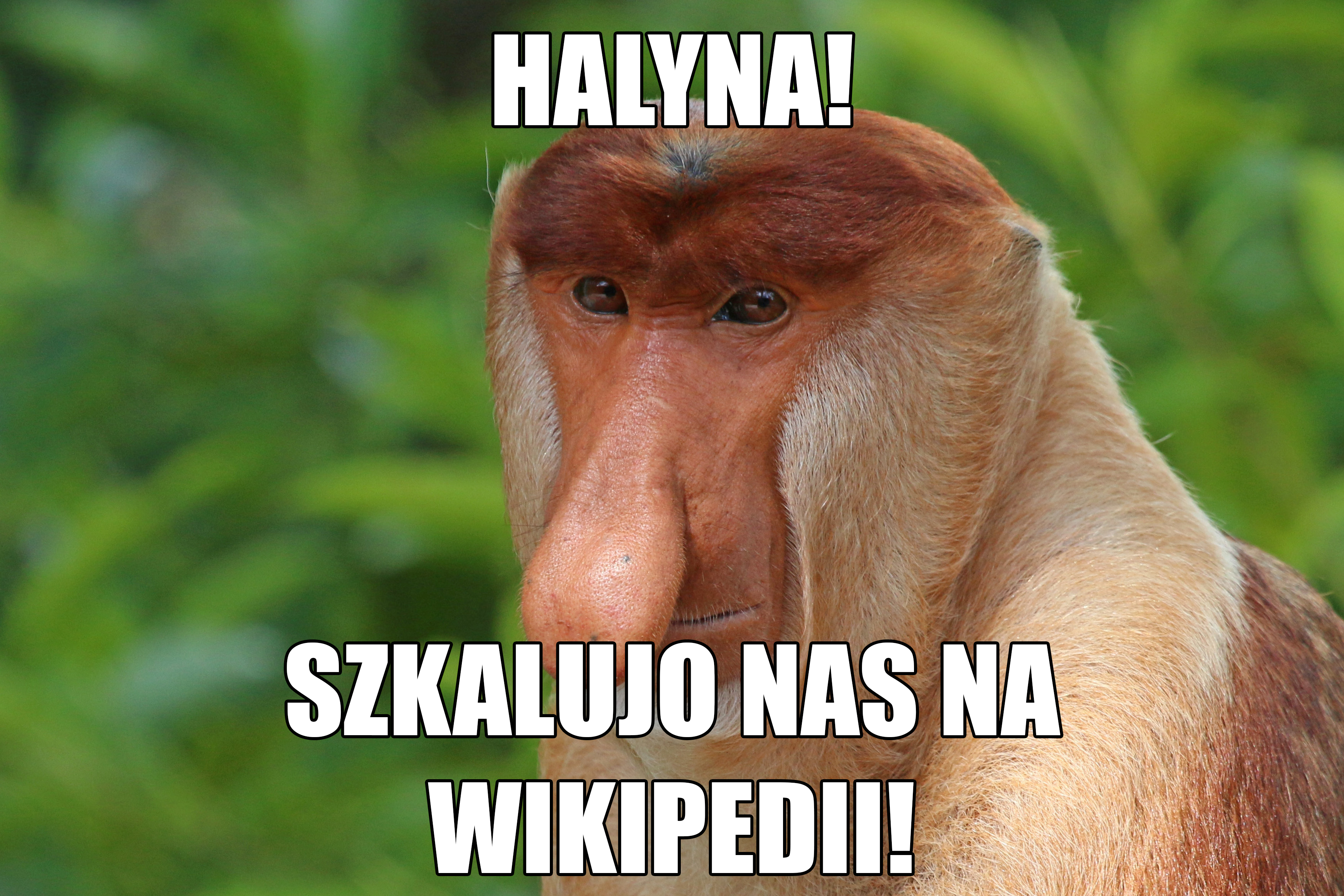
A "Janusz" meme

Janusz is a pejorative term used in Poland by Poles to describe individuals embodying stereotypical negative traits attributed to their own society. Typically depicted as a middle-aged man with a mustache, he is often portrayed wearing a white tank top, white socks paired with sandals, and having a large belly, frequently carrying a discount store shopping bag. Janusz's favorite pastimes include drinking beer and watching television. The archetypal Janusz is sometimes illustrated with the head of a proboscis monkey.

== Description ==
The stereotypical partner of Janusz is Grażyna, characterized as unintelligent, with backcombed or permed hair, a penchant for shopping, and an interest in gossip. Both Janusz and Grażyna are often portrayed as discussing topics beyond their understanding, behaving cunningly, and disregarding social etiquette. Their children, exemplifying stereotypes associated with younger Poles, such as aversion to work, reliance on social benefits, and a sense of entitlement, are referred to as Karyna and Seba. Disdain for Janusz represents broader contempt for what is perceived as provincial Poland and is predominantly expressed by the middle class and hipster subcultures.

The term can also refer to an ignoramus in a broader sense. This meaning is evident in the phrase "Janusz biznesu" ("Janusz of business"), which denotes a person fixated on maximizing short-term gains while embodying negative stereotypes of Polish entrepreneurs. In internet memes portraying the "Janusz biznesu" archetype, the image of Stanisław Derehajło, Deputy Marshal of Podlaskie Voivodeship from 2018 to 2021, was frequently utilized.

== See also ==
- Janusz
