= Pavel Cheben =

Slovak-Canadian engineer and physicist

Pavel Cheben (born 1967) is a Slovak-born Canadian engineer and physicist best known for his contributions to silicon photonics and metamaterial waveguides.

== Early life and education ==
Cheben was born in 1967 in Liptovský Mikuláš, Czechoslovakia (now Slovakia). He received an MSc in Electrical Engineering (Microelectronics and Optoelectronics) from the Slovak Technical University in 1990 and a PhD in Physics (Optics) from the Complutense University of Madrid in 1996.

== Career and research ==
From 1992 to 1997, Pavel Cheben worked at the National Institute for Aerospace Technology (INTA), part of the Spanish Ministry of Defense. In 1997, he joined the National Research Council of Canada (NRC), where he became Principal Research Officer in 2016. He currently holds academic appointments at the McMaster University, University of Málaga, University of Žilina, Carleton University, and the University of Ottawa, and also held positions at the University of Toronto and Complutense University of Madrid.

Cheben was first to demonstrate a compact polarization-insensitive silicon arrayed waveguide grating (AWG) multiplexer. He also introduced a high-resolution spectrometer chip and a stationary, on-chip Fourier-transform spectrometer. His invention of a two-dimensional array of surface grating couplers enabled silicon biochemical sensor arrays and optical phased arrays (OPAs). In 2006, Cheben demonstrated the first subwavelength grating (SWG) metamaterial waveguides, launching the field of metamaterial integrated photonics. In 2010, Cheben’s team demonstrated the first optical metasurface in a planar waveguide. A variety of high-performance metamaterial waveguide devices was developed, with particular focus on telecommunication wavelengths. These include fiber-to-chip edge couplers; wavelength multiplexers; waveguide crossings; broadband interference and directional couplers; biochemical sensors; anti-reflective waveguide facets; silicon mid-infrared and long-infrared waveguide devices; surface grating couplers; polarization splitters, rotators, and polarizers; ultrafast optical switches; integrated spectral filters; waveguide GRIN lenses; temperature-independent waveguides; mode converters and multiplexers; nanoantennas; optical phased arrays; Huygens’ resonant waveguides; and other devices. This work has been extensively reviewed in Nature, Advances in Optics and Photonics, Proceedings of the IEEE, Laser & Photonics Reviews, and other journals.

== Honours and awards ==
2001	Industrial Partnership Award, National Research Council of Canada.
2014	International Prize of the Slovak Academy of Sciences. "For outstanding work in the field of technical sciences."
2014	Fellow, European Optical Society. "For pioneering contributions in subwavelength silicon photonics, waveguide photometers and holographic materials."
2015	Deputy Prime Minister and Minister of Foreign Affairs of the Slovak Republic Prize. "For extraordinary achievements in the field of science and technology."
2015	Fellow, Optical Society of America. "For pioneering contributions to the science of photonic integrated circuits, including Fourier-transform interferometer arrays, nanophotonic couplers and subwavelength engineering in integrated optics."
2017	NRC-ICT Outstanding Achievement Award. National Research Council of Canada. "For extraordinary impact on and contribution to the international photonics community."
2017	Fellow, Institute of Physics (London, United Kingdom).
2018	Fellow, Canadian Academy of Engineering. "For pioneering contributions to photonics and integrated optics science and technology."
2018	Excellence in Research Award, National Research Council of Canada.
2018	Fellow, Engineering Institute of Canada. "In recognition of excellence in engineering and for service to profession and society."
2018	Order of the Republic, Pribina's Cross of the 1st degree. Bestowed by the President of the Slovak Republic.
2019	Fellow, American Physical Society. "For field opening contributions to subwavelength integrated photonics and the experimental and theoretical investigations of metamaterial nanostructures in optical waveguides."
2020	Doctor honoris causa. University of Žilina.
2020	SPIE Community Champion. Named by SPIE President John Greivenkamp, "For outstanding volunteerism in the Society."
2020	Fellow, Royal Society of Canada. "For groundbreaking contributions in silicon photonics fueling fundamental advances in multiple technologies, including optical communications, biomolecular sensing and on-chip spectrometry."
2020	Fellow, International Society for Optics and Photonics (SPIE). "For pioneering contributions to optical science and technology, and for opening and driving the field of subwavelength metamaterial integrated photonics."
2020	Canada Public Service Excellence Award.
2023	Fellow, Institute of Electrical and Electronics Engineers (IEEE). "For contributions to silicon and metamaterial photonics."
2023	International Fellow, Royal Academy of Engineering (London, UK).
2024	IEEE Photonics Society Engineering Achievement Award. "For pioneering contributions to silicon photonic waveguide devices, including the invention of metamaterial waveguides and advancing sub-wavelength integrated photonics technology."
2025	SPIE Maria Goeppert Mayer Award in Photonics. "For ground-breaking contributions in silicon photonics, opening and driving the field of subwavelength integrated photonics, and outstanding service to community."
2025	IEEE Canada Outstanding Engineer Silver Medal Award. "For contributions to integrated subwavelength photonics technology."
