= Alicja Łepkowska-Gołaś =

Polish politician

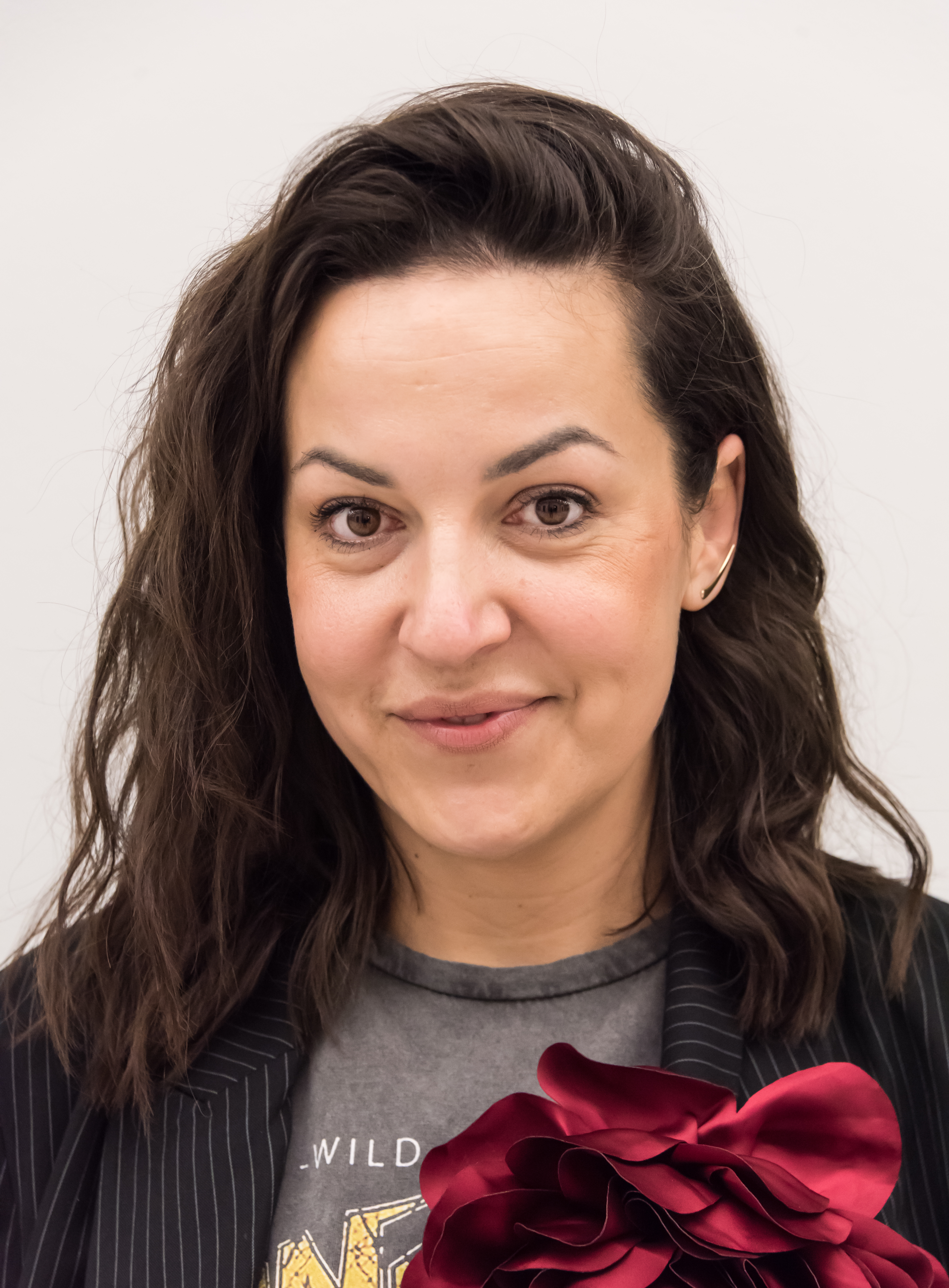

Member of the Sejm
- Incumbent
- Assumed office 12 November 2023
- Constituency: 24-Białystok

Personal details
- Born: 1 January 1983 (age 43) Łomża, Poland
- Citizenship: Poland
- Party: Civic Platform
- Education: Higher School of Public Administration in Ostrołęka
- Occupation: Politician

Alicja Łepkowska-Gołaś (born 1 January 1983 in Łomża) is a Polish politician, local government official and social activist and member of the Sejm of the 10th term.

== Biography ==
In 2009, she obtained a bachelor's degree in public administration from the Higher School of Public Administration in Ostrołęka, and in 2012 a master's degree in human resources management. She started working at the City Hall in Łomża. For ten years, she ran a day care center for refugee children in that city.

She joined the Civic Platform, becoming vice-chair of the party's structures in Łomża. On behalf of the Civic Coalition, she unsuccessfully ran for councilor of Łomża in 2018 and for MP in 2019.

In the 2023 Polish parliamentary election, she ran for the Sejm from the second place on the Civic Platform list in for the Białystok electoral district. she won the mandate of MP of the 10th term, receiving 13,511 votes. In 2024, on behalf of this coalition, she unsuccessfully ran for the European Parliament from district no. 3 (she received 6,198 votes).
