= Jacek Bogucki =

Polish politician

Tadeusz Woźniak

Member of the Sejm
- Incumbent
- Assumed office 25 September 2005
- Constituency: 24 – Białystok

Personal details
- Born: 13 February 1959 (age 67) Wysokie Mazowieckie, Poland
- Party: United Poland
- Other political affiliations: Law and Justice (2005–12)

Jacek Bogucki (born 13 February 1959 in Wysokie Mazowieckie) is a Polish politician. He was elected to the Sejm on 25 September 2005 with 7,189 votes in 24 Białystok district as a candidate from the Law and Justice list.

In 2007, he was reelected, almost doubling his support with 13,236 votes.

On 4 November 2011 he, along with 15 other supporters of the dismissed PiS MEP Zbigniew Ziobro, left Law and Justice on ideological grounds to form a breakaway group, United Poland.

== See also ==
- Members of Polish Sejm 2005-2007
- Members of Polish Sejm 2007-2011
