= Simon Naschér =

Hungarian Jewish religious leader and writer

Rabbi Dr. Sinai Simon Naschér
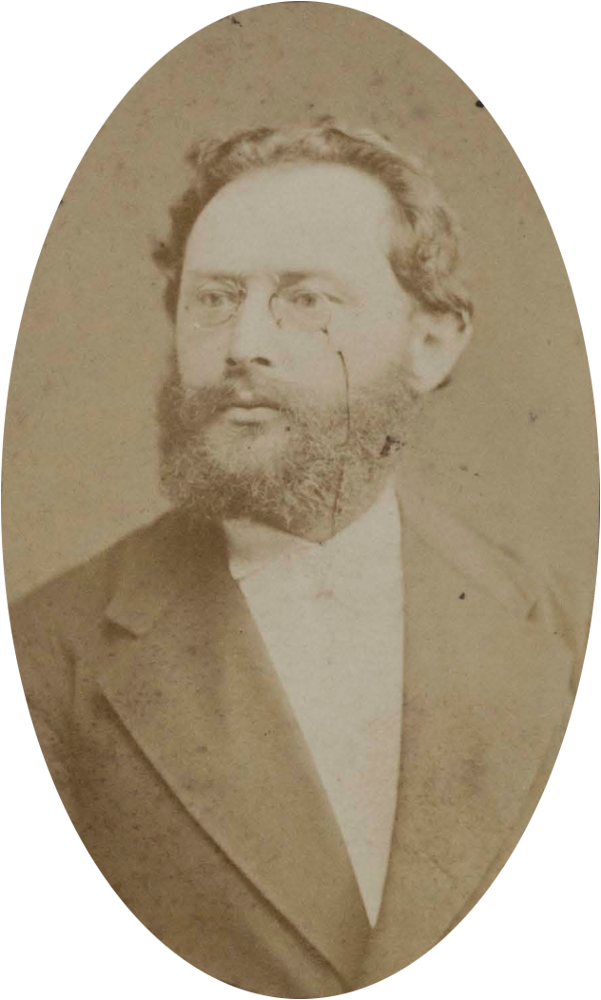
- Born: 16 March 1841; Liptó-Szent-Miklós, Hungary
- Died: 25 July 1901 (aged 60); Baja, Austria-Hungary
- Occupations: Rabbi, writer
- Writing career
- Language: German

Sinai Simon Naschér (16 March 1841 – 25 July 1901) was a Hungarian Jewish religious leader and writer.

== Biography ==
Naschér was born to a rabbinic family in Liptó-Szent-Miklós, the son of Eva (née Simandel-Nicolauer) and Rabbi Moses Naschér. His paternal grandfather, Jonathan Nascher, served as rabbi of Bielitz, Austrian Silesia, while his maternal grandfather, Beer Simandel-Nicolauer, was a rabbi in Liptó-Szent-Miklós. Naschér was educated at the gymnasium in Baja as a student of József Kolmár. He later studied in Berlin, where he was ordained by the Hochschule für die Wissenschaft des Judentums and received his Ph.D. from the University.

From 1866 he was a rabbi and preacher in Berlin, and delivered sermons at the Orthodox Schochare Hattob Congregation synagogue on Neue Friedrichstraße. He was, however, eventually forced to resign in 1880 on account of the deterioration of his mental health. From then on he lived in retirement at Baja.

== Bibliography ==
- Worte des Dankes: Rede gehalten bei Erlangung der Morenu-Würde im Tempel zu Baja. Baja. 1860.
- Gottesdienstlicher Vortrag am 1. Pesach-Feiertag im Gotteshause zu Szegszard gehalten. Pest. 1860.
- "Über Jüdische Kanzel-Exegese". Ben Chananja. IX: 500ff, 818ff, 531ff. 1860.
- Unsere Richtung. Glauben ist Denken. Berlin. 1860.
- Der Gaon Haja. Ein Beitrag zur Geschichte der semitischen Sprachforschung. Berlin: Stuhr'sche Buchhandlung (S. Gerstmann). 1867.
- Die Sentenz bei Juden und Arabern. Eine vergleichende Studie. Berlin: Stuhr'sche Buchhandlung (S. Gerstmann). 1868.
- Grabrede beim Tode des sel. Nathan in Rathenow. Berlin. 1871.
- Einfluß der Deutschen Philosophie auf die Volksbildung. Berlin: Verlag der Stuhr'schen Buch- und Kunsthandlung (S. Gerstmann). 1872.
- Wissenschaftliche Vorträge. I. Die moralische Wirkung der Kunst. II. Die Faustdichtung von Goethe und Lenau. III. Der Einfluss der deutschen Philosophie auf die deutsche Volksbildung. Berlin: Lüderitz'sche Verlagsbuchhandlung (Carl Habel). 1875.
- Das Judenthum der Aufklärung. Reden für die Gebildeten Aller Confessionen. Magdeburg: Verlag von W. Simon. 1876.
- Franz Deák. Gedächtnissrede, gehalten am 28. Jänner 1877 im Berliner Ungar-Verein. Berlin: W. Weber. 1877.
- Die jüdische Gemeinde in ihrer Vergangenheit, Gegenwart und Zukunft. Reden für Freunde religiöser Cultur und Freiheit. Berlin: Louis Gerschel Verlagsbuchhandlung. 1877.
- Moses Naschér (Oberrabbiner von Baja). Eine Exegetische Monographie. Berlin: Verlag bon Friedrich Stahn. 1879.
- Vier Momente. Gottesdienstliche Rede, zur Feier 25-jähr. Stiftung der Gemeinde Schochare Hattob in Berlin am 3. Jan. 1880 gehalten. Berlin. 1880.
- "Der Gaon von Wilna als talmudischer Forscher". Jüdisches Litteratur-Blatt. XXII. Magdeburg: 56ff, 73ff, 81ff, 100ff.
- Auswahl von Gedichten, nach dem ungarischen Texte des Dichters Reviczky Gyula, in metrischer deutscher Übertragung und mit einer Einleitung versehen. Aus dem Anlasse der Feier tausendjähriger Stiftung des ungar. Staates veröffentlicht. Budapest and Leipzig: R. Lampel & B. Witt. 1896.
- "Psychiatrisches in der Bibel". Allgemeine Zeitung des Judentums. 30: 356f. 1898.
