= Janosch (given name) =

Male given name

- Pronunciation: German: [ˈjaːnɔʃ]
- Gender: Male
- Language: German

Other names
- Related names: Jan, Janus, János, Janusz

Janosch is a masculine given name. It is the German variant of the Hungarian name János. Notable people with the name include:

- Janosch (1931–2026), pseudonym of the German author and illustrator Horst Eckert
- Janosch Brugger (born 1997), German cross-country skier
- Janosch Dahmen (born 1981), German physician and politician
- Janosch Dziwior (born 1974), German footballer
- Janosch Sülzer (born 1996), German canoeist

== See also ==
- Janos (disambiguation)
