= János Cserni =

János Cserni (born Budapest, 1971) is a Hungarian judge and journalist, the founding member of Galamus, a left-wing Hungarian online newspaper. Cserni holds degrees of both journalism and law.

== Work ==
Cserni's judgements first gained media attention, when in an unprecedented ruling, he sentenced András Bencsik, to time in prison in a criminal trial for libel, instead of a monetary fine. Bencsik, the editor of the right wing paper, Magyar Demokrata was sued for an article written by Attila Bertók László. The verdict concerned statements made about SZDSZ politician Imre Mécs and was followed by international protest and condemnation. The Supreme Court of Hungary finally overruled Cserni's verdict and sentenced Bencsik to a fine of 60 000 Ft ($300), instead of prison. Cserni did not accept that verdict and turned to the Constitutional Court of Hungary. The Hungarian Judges Association launched an ethics investigation against Cserni regarding that matter, admonishing Cserni, because he publicly accused the Supreme Court of breaking the law. After the case Cserni was banned from ruling on media and press cases. In 2007 Cserni founded Ibike, along with 10 current and former justice system workers, including sociologist Zoltán Fleck. Ibike is an association campaigning for Ideal Direction and Oversight of Courts. This association proved to be controversial, according to the Hungarian Judges Association it was created to "defame judges as a group". Cserni publicly denounced laws stopping judges from making political actions and statements and commenting on cases, particularly their own. In 2007 Cserni turned to the Constitutional Court and asked it to strike down the 1997 LXVIIth law about judges' rights. The law according to him limits the right of judges, to free speech, in the case of political speech and the ability to comment on present and past cases. In 2007 Cserni received a written warning for his political activity. Cserni's media activity became controversial among fellow judges. According to the chief judge of the Budapest Court, Cserni is critical towards the justice system since he wasn't elected as vice chair of the Budapest Court. Cserni is a founding member and journalist of Galamus since the site's founding in 2009. He regularly publishes articles on the site. A 2010 political article of Cserni titled Fight of the martyr(„A mártír harca”) became controversial, because of the political attacks it contained. The title of the article was a reference to a slur used by Gábor Kuncze against Máriusz Révész, after Révész was attacked and severely injured in 2006. Within a short time an investigation was launched against Cserni because of the strong political content of the article. According to László Gatter, Chief Justice of the court at the time, the article was "clearly a violation of rules of conduct, prohibiting judges from taking political positions". According to Cserni the article, including sentences like "the parliamentary majority could wipe off the rules limiting the comments of judges as easily as they could wipe fly shit" off of a document, was within the limits of what is permissible, and not of political nature. In 2011 Cserni sentenced Ágnes Geréb to two years in prison, in a case involving a death, while a mother was giving birth at home under the supervision of doctor Geréb. In 2011 Cserni said he will not run for any higher position within the justice system, and talked about possibly running a restaurant, after the end of his career. He discussed regretting one verdict in particular, which was later overturned. Cserni is single as of 2011.
