= Jánoš =

Jánoš (feminine: Jánošová) is a Czech and Slovak surname, derived from the given name Jan. Notable people with the surname include:

- Adam Jánoš (born 1992), Czech footballer
- Anton Jánoš (born 1958), Slovak footballer and manager
- Branislav Jánoš (born 1971), Slovak ice hockey player
- Štefan Jánoš (born 1943), Slovak-Swiss physicist
- Vladimír Jánoš (born 1945), Czech rower
- Zdeněk Jánoš (1967–1999), Czech footballer
