= Janus Adams =

American journalist

- Born: January 11, 1947 (age 79)
- Education: Mills College at Northeastern University
- Occupation: Journalist

Janus Adams (born January 11, 1947) is an American journalist, historian, author, talk show host, publisher, producer, and the creator of BackPax children's media.

== Biography ==
As a journalist, Adams' radio and TV talk shows aired for ten years, and her syndicated column ran for sixteen years. Her master's degree from Mills College in Pan-African Culture was the nation's first graduate degree awarded in Black studies. She was NPR's first National Arts Correspondent, and currently hosts The Janus Adams Show on public radio station WJFF-FM. She is a frequent television commentator and public speaker.

At 8, Adams was one of four black children selected to integrate a White school in New York in order to break segregation.

== Books ==
- A Mystical Journey Into Cajun Country (BackPax, 1986)
- Journey to the Moon -- and Beyond (BackPax, 1988)
- Traveling Mark Twain's America (BackPax, 1988)
- Escape to Freedom: Underground Railroad (BackPax, 1988)
- Routes 'n Roots: An Explorer's Guide to America (BackPax, 1988)
- Glory Days (Harper Perennial, 1996)
- Freedom Days : 365 inspired moments in civil rights history (Wiley, 1998)
- Way to Go! The BackPax Parents' Guide to Empowering Adventurous Young Minds (BackPax, 2014)

== Radio ==
- The Janus Adams Show (WJFF-FM, 2016–present)
- The Tavis Smiley Show (NPR, 2002 - 2004)
