= Janos Sztipanovits =

American computer scientist

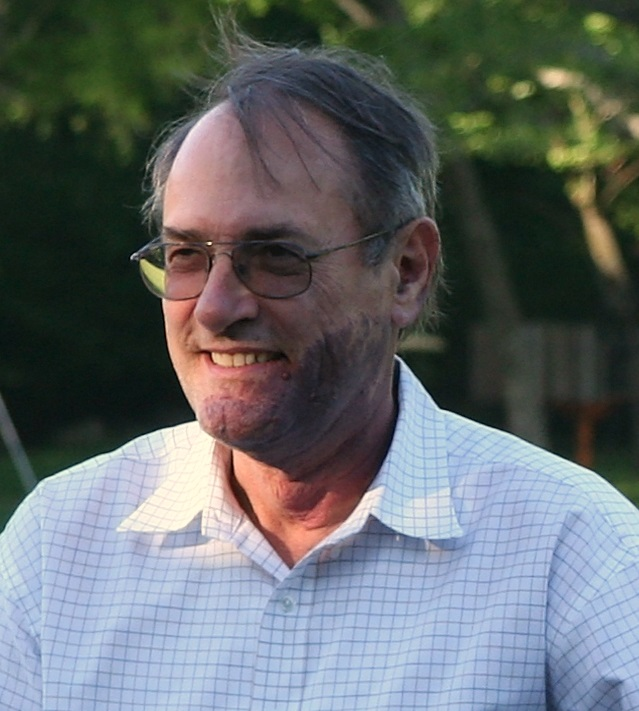
- Portrait of Janos Sztipanovits
- Born: July 2, 1946 (age 80)
- Citizenship: USA
- Education: Budapest University of Technology and Economics
- Scientific career
- Fields: Cyber-physical systems
- Workplaces: Vanderbilt University

Janos Sztipanovits is an electrical engineer and computer scientist. He is the E. Bronson Ingram Distinguished Professor of Engineering at the Department of Electrical Engineering and Computer Science at Vanderbilt University. He is the founding director of the Institute for Software Integrated Systems at Vanderbilt.

== Research ==
Sztipanovits led the research group that created a novel area in computer engineering called Model Integrated Computing (MIC) in the 1990s well before other model-based approaches appeared in computer science. MIC applies metamodeling to define domain-specific modeling languages and to automatically configure the corresponding domain-specific visual modeling environment. The domain models then are used to automatically generate and/or configure the software of the modeled system. MIC and its primary software tool called Generic Modeling Environment (GME, a kind of MetaCASE tool) have been successfully applied to embedded software, car manufacturing and medical systems, among many other areas.

Sztipanovits was one of the key promoters of a new research direction called Cyber-Physical Systems (CPS), which integrates physical systems with computational ("cyber") systems to provide novel capabilities. He is the Principal Investigator of a National Science Foundation initiative to create a web portal called CPS Virtual Organization (CPS VO) with the goal of facilitating interaction and information exchange among CPS researchers in academia, government and industry across a broad range of institutions, programs, disciplines and even countries.

== Awards ==
Before moving to the United States in 1983, Sztipanovits received a number of prestigious awards in Hungary, including the National Prize in 1985 and the Golden Ring of the Republic in 1982 for scientific and engineering achievements.

He received the Medal for Exceptional Public Service from the Office of the Secretary for Defense in 2002 and the Air Force Meritorious Civilian Service Award Medal and a Citation in 2010. He has been an external member of the Hungarian Academy of Sciences since 2010. Sztipanovits is a Fellow of the IEEE.

In 2018, he became an honorary John von Neumann Professor at the Budapest University of Technology and Economics.
