= Janos Trail =

Former trade route

The Janos Trail was a trade route from the mountains of southern New Mexico to Janos, Chihuahua. It was the main route for copper ore from Santa Rita del Cobre to the smelters in Chihuahua.

== History ==
The route of the Janos Trail follows an old Native American trade route to Chihuahua. The Janos Trail was established about 1803 by the Spanish after they discovered the copper in the Pinos Altos Mountains of the Black Range at Santa Rita.
