= János Spiegel =

Hungarian violin maker (1876 - 1956)

János Spiegel (1876-1956) was a Hungarian violin maker. He was born in Sopron, Hungary in 1876 and died in Budapest in 1956. Spiegel worked for W.J Schunda from 1896 to 1896 and worked for R.Lumman from 1896 to 1900. He made several types of string instruments including cellos, violas, and violins. Spiegel also made 80 cellos with assistance from craftsman in his workshop in Hungary. Over his lifetime he produced about 600 string instruments.

Spiegel's instruments are distinguished by having reddish varnish and one or two piece backs (depending on the type of instrument). He changed his varnish colours to a bright orange or gold colour around in 1920.
