= Janusz Pasierb =

Polish Catholic priest, poet and historian (1929–1993)

Janusz Stanisław Pasierb (7 January 1929 – 15 December 1993) was a Polish Catholic priest, poet and writer, historian.
