= János Bókai Sr. =

Hungarian academic and pediatrician

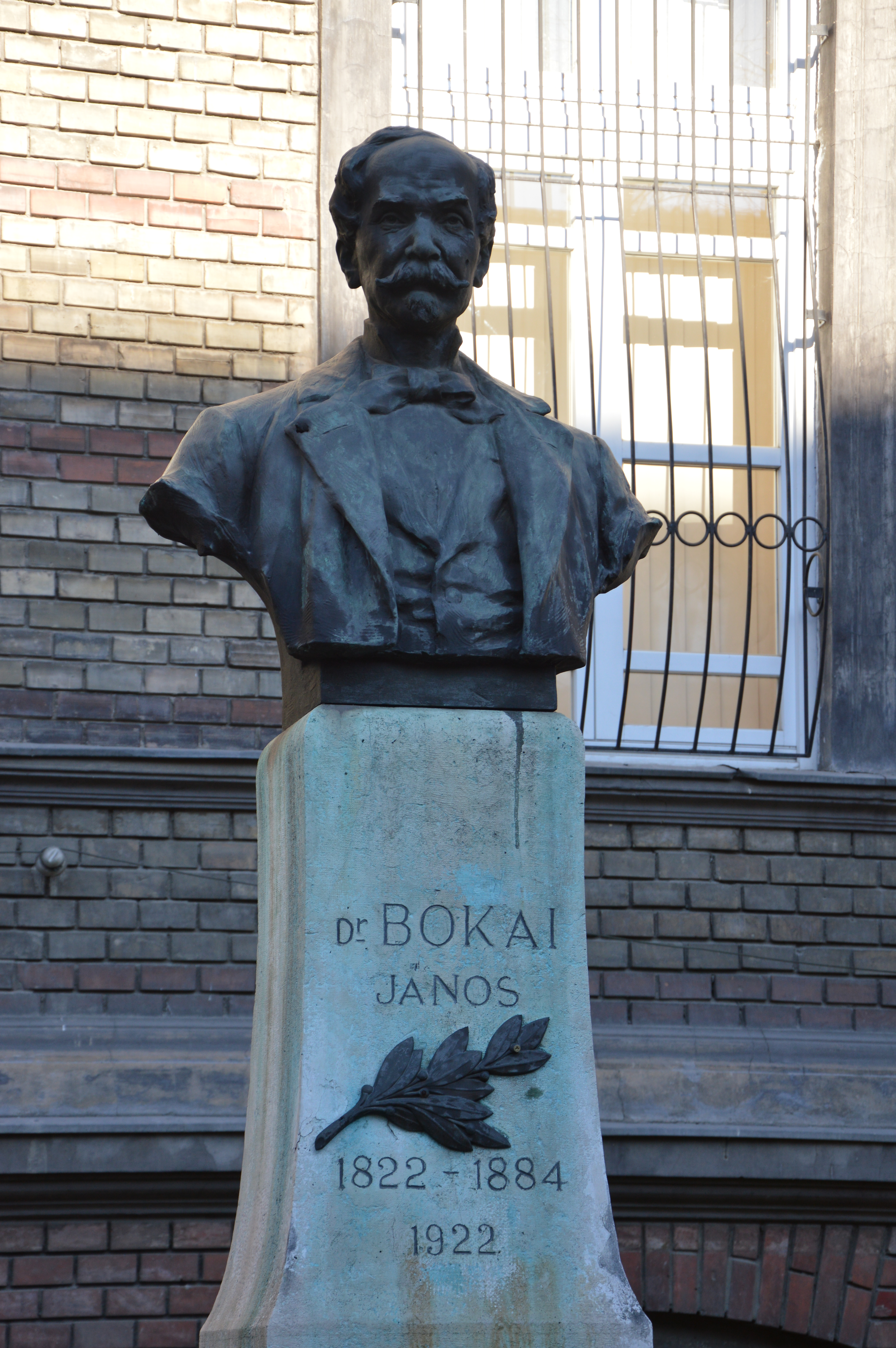
Statue of János Bókai in Budapest

János Bókai (né Bock János; 18 May 1822 – 20 October 1884) was a Hungarian academic, professor, pediatrician and the director of a children's hospital in Budapest. He also pioneered rhino-laryngology and the development of laryngoscopy and rhinoscopy. He wrote the anamnesis of Ignaz Semmelweis which played a role in the admission of Semmelweis to an insane asylum, where he died.

His sons were János Bókay Jr. and Árpád Bókay, both medical doctors.
