= Roman Woźniak =

Mayor of Białystok
- In office September 1953 – September 1956
- Preceded by: Jadwiga Zubrycka
- Succeeded by: Bogdan Załuski

Personal details
- Born: 24 November 1909 Majdan, Congress Poland
- Died: 12 March 1963 Białystok, Polish People's Republic
- Party: Polish United Workers' Party
- Profession: Steelworker, politician

Roman Woźniak (born February 23, 1903 in the Majdan Steelworks, died March 12, 1963) was a Polish communist politician, steelworker who served as the starosta of Bielsk County, and Mayor of Białystok from 1953 to 1956.

== Biography ==
He was born in Majdan. He completed primary school. At the age of 10, he took a job at a local glassworks due to family circumstances. In 1921, he participated in the Third Silesian Uprising, and in 1924–1925, he did his military service in the 72nd Infantry Regiment of the Polish Army in Radom. He continued his work as a steelworker, working at a glassworks in Białystok from 1934, and chaired the local works council from 1939 to 1941. He was active in the Glass Industry Workers' Trade Union. Due to his communist activities during World War II, he hid from the Germans.

In July or August 1944, he joined the Polish Workers' Party in Białystok, later joining the Polish United Workers' Party. From 1944, he organized the Bielsk County Office and held the position of starosta. At the end of 1948, he moved to work as head of the Socio-Political Department of the Voivodeship Office in Białystok. In 1950, he became chairman of the regional office of the Association of Trade Unions in that city and a member of the executive committee of the Voivodeship Committee of the Polish United Workers' Party in Białystok. The following year, he became head of the Economic Department of the Voivodeship Committee of the Polish United Workers' Party in Białystok, and in September 1953, he assumed the position of chairman of the Presidium of the Municipal National Council (mayor) there. In September 1956, he resigned from this position due to health reasons and retired. Towards the end of his life, he was active in the Municipal Party Control Commission of the Polish United Workers' Party. He was buried in the Municipal Cemetery in Białystok.
