= Witold Wenclik =

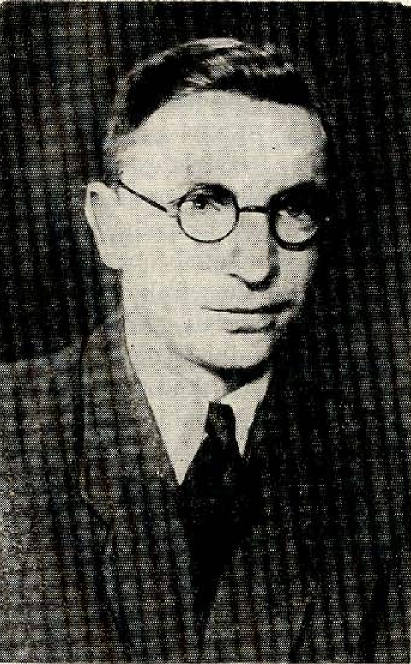

Mayor of Białystok
- In office 28 August 1944 – May 1945
- Preceded by: Ryszard Gołębiewski
- Succeeded by: Andrzej Krzewniak

Personal details
- Born: 21 June 1911 Białystok, Congress Poland
- Died: Białystok, Poland
- Party: Democratic Party
- Education: Vilnius University; Higher Institute of Law in Minsk
- Profession: Lawyer, politician
- Awards: Order of Polonia Restituta; Cross of Merit

Witold Wenclik (born June 21, 1911, in Białystok, died September 8, 1993, there) was a Polish judge and attorney, a local government official, who in 1945 served as mayor of Białystok, and from 1945 to 1952 a member of the State National Council and the Legislative Sejm.

== Biography ==
After graduating from the Sigismund Augustus High School in Białystok, he studied at the Faculty of Law of Vilnius Stefan Batory University, where he became involved with a leftist youth group. He was also a member of the Christian academic fraternity "Conradia." Until the outbreak of World War II, he worked in the Białystok judiciary. During the Soviet occupation of the city, he practiced as an attorney and also studied at the Higher Institute of Law in Minsk. After the Białystok region was incorporated into East Prussia in 1941, he worked as an accountant in a glassworks. After Białystok was liberated from German occupation in 1944 and handed over to Poland he organized the Polish administration there. In 1945, he briefly served as Mayor of Białystok and was later appointed Chairman of the Voivodeship National Council (1945–1950). He established the Democratic Party (Alliance of Democrats) in the Białystok Voivodeship. He served as a member of the Democratic Party in the State National Council and the Legislative Sejm. After retiring from active politics, he worked as a lawyer. He also worked in the Democratic Party's central party apparatus.

He was awarded, among other distinctions, the Knight's Cross of the Order of Polonia Restituta and twice the Gold Cross of Merit. In December 1983, he was awarded the Commemorative Medal commemorating the 40th anniversary of the establishment of the State National Council.

He was married to Wanda Iżele. He died in 1993 and was buried at the Municipal Cemetery in Białystok.
