= Wincenty Hermanowski =

Polish pharmacist and politician

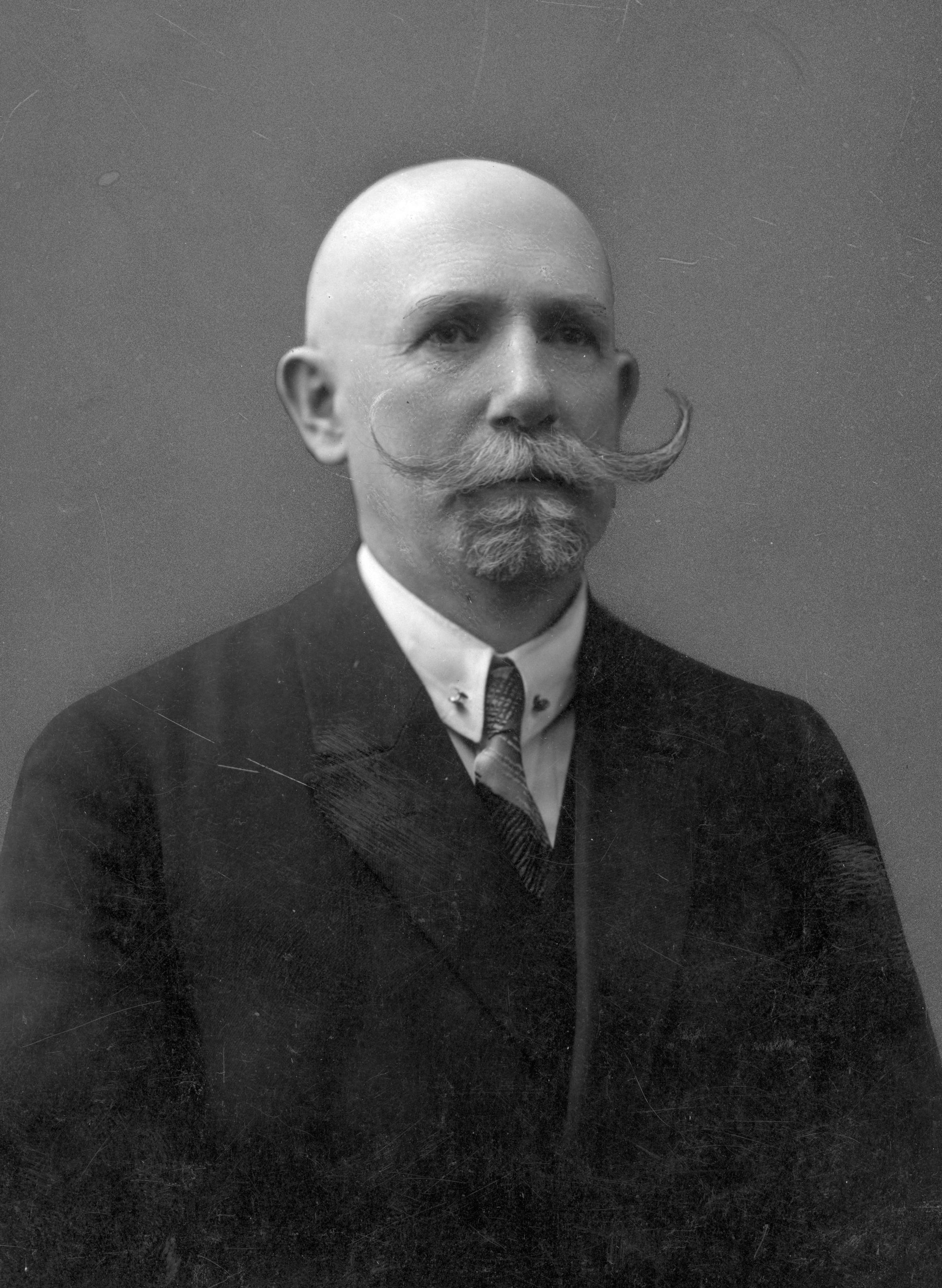

Mayor of Białystok
- In office 26 November 1928 – 10 August 1932
- Preceded by: Michał Ostrowski
- Succeeded by: Seweryn Nowakowski

Personal details
- Born: April 3, 1875 Radule, Congress Poland
- Died: 19 November 1947 (aged 72)
- Resting place: Farny Cemetery
- Profession: Pharmacist, politician

Wincenty Hermanowski (born April 3, 1875 - November 19, 1947) was a Polish pharmacist and local government politician who served as the mayor of Białystok from 1928 to 1932.

== Biography ==
Born in 1875 in Radule near Tykocin, in 1895 he was exiled to Vologda in the Russian Empire for organizing illegal Polish youth groups in a Łomża grammar school. In Russia he completed his pharmaceutical studies and in 1912 he moved to Białystok into Jankiel Rachites's tenement house on the corner of Aleksandrowska and Instytucka Streets (now Warszawska and Pałacowa Streets). He became involved in public life and in August 1915 in his apartment, the Society for the Aid of Polish Schools was established, thanks to which the first Polish primary school in the city was established in November 1915.

On September 7, 1919, in the first local government election following the regaining of independence and the establishment of the Second Polish Republic, he was elected to the Białystok City Council.

During the Battle of Białystok, in August 1920, he was in the city. Dring the onslaught of Bolshevik savagery and various bloody excesses, Hermanowski was oftenon the streets of the city, defending the lives and property of our fellow citizens, preventing robbery, rape, pogroms, and bloodshed, exposing himself to danger.

Being a fierce opponent of the chairman of the city council Feliks Filipowicz, he resigned from the city council in 1925 and didn't take part in the 1927 local election. Yet, in 1928, following the resignation of Michał Ostrowski the city council chose him to be the next mayor.

His tenure was overshadowed by difficulties, both financial and political. Hermanowski was unable to control his associates. Political divisions fueled by personal animosities increasingly paralyzed the work of the local government. His main opponent was the voivode of Białystok Voivodeship, Marian Zyndram-Kościałkowski, appointed in July 1930. Another opponent was the government commissioner to the city, Seweryn Nowakowski, appointed in August 1931. Both Zyndram Kościałkowski and Nowakowski were associated with the pro-sanacja organization Nonpartisan Bloc for Cooperation with the Government, while Hermanowski was associated with the Endecja camp. In 1932, at the midst of discussion and review of the city budget by the voivodeship office and the city hall, fierce disagreement over budget cuts resulted in the voivode dissolving the city council, effectively ousting Hermanowski from power. Hermanowswki retired from political life and returned to run his pharmacy, Pod Łabędziem at 24 Warszawska Street.

As a person interested in education issues, he participated at the 1st National Congress of Representatives of Parental Associations, held in 1927 in Warsaw and organized by the Union of Parental Associations in Poland. He expressed his position that the reform of the moral education of young people should begin with adults setting a good example. He also emphasized that it is necessary to become aware of the existing flaws in society, including unpunctuality, talkativeness, lack of dutifulness, or lack of civic courage. He was a member of the Union of Polish Cities, president of the Białystok Voivodeship Cities Circle in 1932.

Little is known about the fate of Wincenty Hermanowski in the years 1939-1944. In 1942 he was taken hostage. He escaped death, but was ordered to leave Białystok. He then moved to Bielsk Podlaski, where he lived until the end of the war and owned a pharmacy at 7 Rynkowa Street. On July 21, 1945, he became a member of the State National Council, remaining non-partisan. He was nominated by the Voivodeship National Council based on his position as chairman of the District National Council, but was dismissed at its request on April 26, 1946. He died in November 1947 and was buried in the Farny Cemetery in the city.
