= Zygmunt Bezubik =

Polish politician

Mayor of Białystok
- In office 1965–1972
- Preceded by: Jerzy Krochmalski
- Succeeded by: Aleksander Czuż

Personal details
- Born: 7 March 1927 Congress Poland
- Died: 28 December 1989 (aged 62)
- Resting place: Municipal Cemetery in Białystok
- Party: Polish United Workers' Party
- Education: School of Master Weavers, Textile Technical School in Łódź
- Profession: Textile worker, politician

Zygmunt Bezubik (March 7, 1927 – December 28, 1989) was a Polish party official and a politician who served as Mayor of Białystok of from 1965 to 1972.

== Biography ==
He graduated from the School of Master Weavers (1950) and the Textile Technical School in Łódź (1957). From 1941, he worked in a textile factory, holding the position of technical controller. In 1956, he was employed at the Białystok Textile Industry Plant "Sierżana." In the 1950s, he became head and secretary of the Economic Department of the Municipal Committee of the Polish United Workers' Party in Białystok. In 1960, he joined the executive board of that PZPR City Municipal Committee in Białystok. From 1964 to mid-1972, he served as Chairman of the Presidium of the Municipal National Council in Białystok (mayor). From 1972 to 1978, he was the director of the Białystok Tannery.

He was buried at the Municipal Cemetery in Białystok.
