= Krzysztof Truskolaski =

Polish politician

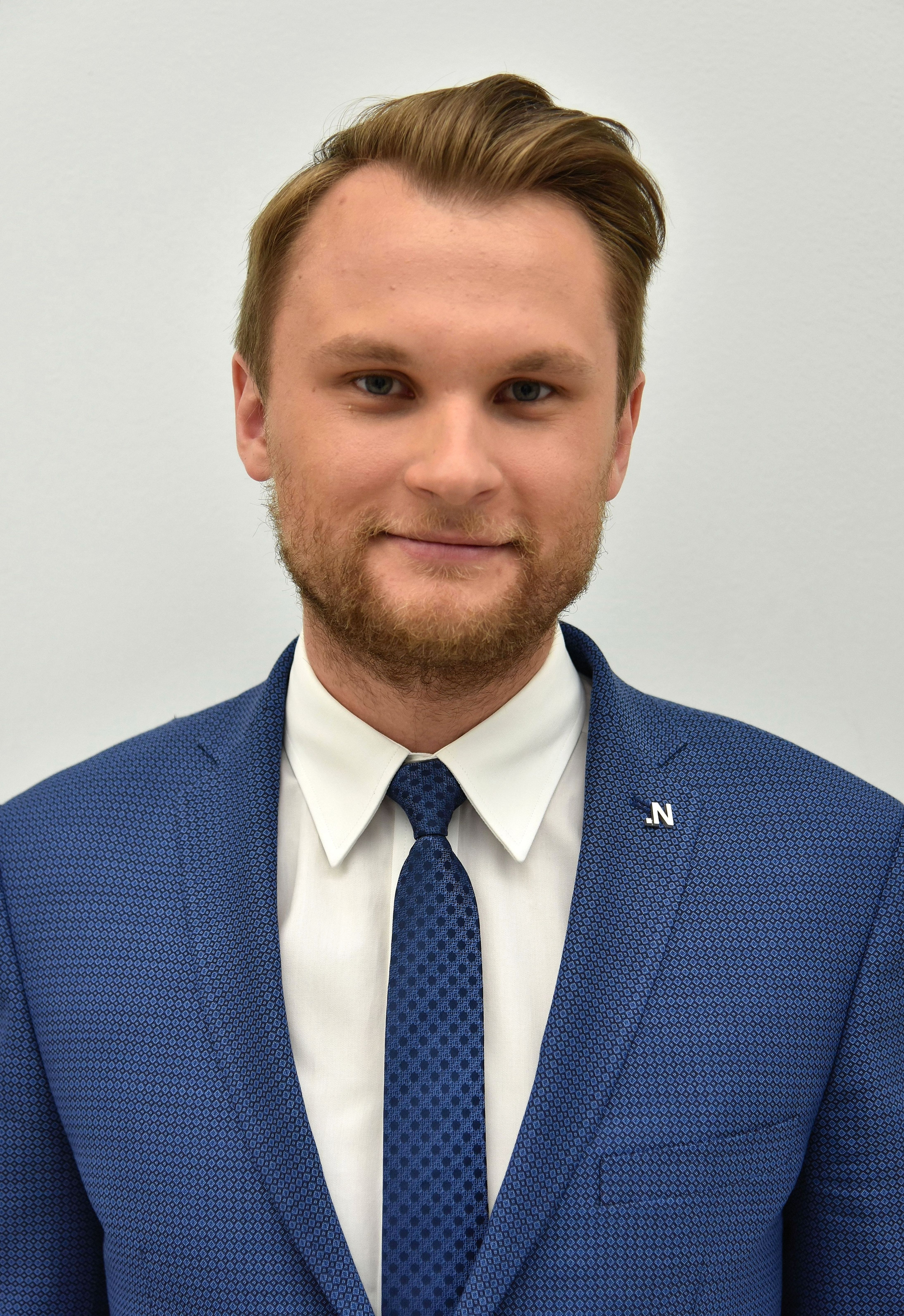

Member of the Sejm
- Incumbent
- Assumed office 12 November 2015
- Constituency: 24-Białystok

Personal details
- Born: 25 July 1990 (age 36) Białystok, Poland
- Citizenship: Poland
- Party: Civic Platform
- Other political affiliations: Modern (2015-2018)
- Parent: Tadeusz Truskolaski (father)
- Education: University of Białystok
- Occupation: Politician

Krzysztof Truskolaski (born 25 July 1990) is a Polish politician who is serving as member of the Sejm of the 9th term.

== Biography ==
He is the son of the Mayor of Białystok, Tadeusz Truskolaski. In 2014, he graduated in economics from the Faculty of Economics and Management of the University of Białystok. In 2019, he obtained a master's degree in management at this faculty. He worked in the sales and marketing department of a local company, and was active in the youth city council in Białystok.

In the 2015 parliamentary elections, he ran for the Sejm in the Białystok constituency from the first place on the Nowoczesna list. He was elected as an MP of the 8th term, receiving 14,141 votes. He was, among others, delegate of the Polish Parliament to the Parliamentary Assembly of the Council of Europe. In December 2018, he joined the Civic Platform – Civic Coalition parliamentary club. At the end of July 2019, he joined Civic Platform.

In the elections in the same year, he successfully ran for parliamentary re-election on behalf of the Civic Coalition, receiving 37,237 votes.
