= Tadeusz Naczas =

Polish politician

Mayor of Białystok
- In office 15 October 1981 – June 1986
- Preceded by: Aleksander Czuż
- Succeeded by: Zbigniew Zdrojewski

Personal details
- Born: 19 September 1935 (age 91) Sobieszyn, Second Polish Republic
- Party: Polish United Workers' Party
- Education: Warsaw University of Technology
- Profession: Engineer, politician

Tadeusz Naczas (born September 19, 1935) is a Polish engineer and politician who from 1974 to 1981 served as vice Mayor and then Mayor of Białystok from 1981 to 1986.

== Biography ==
He was born in Sobieszyn. A graduate of the Warsaw University of Technology, specializing in automotive and engine construction, he began working at MPK Białystok in 1957 as a technician and shift supervisor. From 1959 to 1962, he served as head of the technical department, from 1962 as deputy director for technical affairs, and from 1973 as first deputy director and director of MPK. He became head of the MPK's company technology and rationalization club. On February 1, 1974, he assumed the position of Vice Mayor of Białystok. On October 15, 1981, during a session of the Municipal National Council, two candidates to the position of city mayor were announced: Józef Grajewski, director of the Voivodeship Internal Trade Enterprise, and Tadeusz Naczas who was the incumbent vice-president of the city. In a vote, councillors recommended Naczas for the position of mayor of Białystok. Consequently, the Białystok Voivode, Kazimierz Dunaj appointed him mayor.

His tenure coincided with a deepening economic and political crisis that culminated in the imposition of martial law in December 1981. Ration cards failed to meet basic needs, speculation was widespread, and people were exhausted from standing in endless lines. Under pressure from workers to strike, the Regional Board of Solidarity in Białystok demanded that Voivode Kazimierz Dunaj and President Tadeusz Naczas take action. They called for regulations on the sale of food and industrial goods, the creation of a list of essential items to be controlled, the regionalization and registration of buyers and ration cards to eliminate queues, and decisive measures to boost the purchase of agricultural products.

On December 13, 1981, a ceremony was scheduled at the Białystok Cathedral to consecrate the banner of the NSZZ "Solidarność" Wool Industry Works Commission, named after Serżan. After learning that martial law had been declared, the Commission's chairman, Eugeniusz Brański, went to the workplace to decide whether to proceed. When union representatives contacted the city mayor, Tadeusz Naczas, he clarified that although martial law suspended the activities of all organizations, associations, and trade unions, it did not prohibit church ceremonies. As a result, the banner was consecrated as planned. On December 14, 1981, officers of the Security Service and the Milicja Obywatelska gathered for a meeting with the presence of a representative of the mayor of Białystok and drew up a report of the takeover of the headquarters of the "Solidarity" Regional Board. In the following days, the Security Service took away the library and archives, confiscated two chequebooks and cash. In June 1986 he resigned and was succeeded by Zbigniew Zdrojewski.
