= Jerzy Krochmalski =

Polish politician

Mayor of Białystok
- In office 1958–1965
- Preceded by: Bogdan Załuski
- Succeeded by: Zygmunt Bezubik

Personal details
- Born: 1915; Congress Poland
- Died: 26 September 1999
- Political party: Polish United Workers' Party
- Profession: Politician
- Awards: Cross of Merit

Jerzy Krochmalski (born 1915 - died 26 September 1999) was a Polish politician who served as Mayor of Białystok from 1958 to 1965.

== Biography ==
Son of Feliks, he graduated with a master's degree and was a member of the State Employees' Trade Union. He was also active in the Volunteer Fire Department Association, including serving as a delegate from the Białystok Voivodeship to the national congress.

He was a member of the Polish Workers' Party and the Polish United Workers' Party, and served on the executive board of the PZPR City Committee in Białystok. Between January and July 1945, he served as a lay judge on the Suwałki city council. From January to November 1945, he was a member of the Suwałki City National Council. From the second half of 1958 to 1964, he served as chairman of the Presidium of the City National Council in Białystok, the mayor's title at that period. As chairman of the City National Council, he participated in events such as the Białystok portion of the World Esperanto Congress in 1959. In 1954 he was awarded the Silver Cross of Merit.

He was married to Emilia Krochmalska (1920–2007), a professor of laryngology. They had a daughter, Lucyna Kieracińska, an ophthalmologist, and a son, Ryszard, a graduate of the Warsaw University of Technology. He was buried in the Farny Cemetery in Białystok.
