= Andrzej Lussa =

Polish physician, academic professor and a local government politician

Mayor of Białystok
- In office 13 July 1994 – 13 April 1995
- Preceded by: Lech Rutkowski
- Succeeded by: Krzysztof Jurgiel

Personal details
- Born: 20 February 1948 Otwock, Polish People's Republic
- Died: 13 April 1995 (aged 47) Białystok, Poland
- Resting place: Farny Cemetery
- Profession: Physician, politician
- Awards: Cross of Merit

Andrzej Piotr Lussa (February 20, 1948 – April 13, 1995) was a Polish physician, academic professor and a local government politician who served as the mayor of Białystok in 1994–1995.

== Biography ==
He was the son of Franciszek Lussa (pseudonym "Grześ"), a soldier of the Home Army.

A physician by education and profession, he obtained a doctorate in medical sciences, specializing in pathophysiology. He was a researcher at the Medical Academy in Białystok. In 1980, he founded the university structures of Solidarity. After 1989, he organized regional medical chambers.

Immediately after the formation of the new Białystok City Council in June 1994 following the local elections, "Jedność" nominated Andrzej Piotr Lussa for mayor of Białystok. None of the clubs nominated a rival candidate. After a vote in which 50 councilors participated, his candidacy was supported by 27 councilors, 14 against, and 9 abstentions. During his tenure he supported the construction of the monument in the location of the Great Synagogue and the monument to Jerzy Popiełuszko Upon taking office in mid-July 1994, Andrzej Lussa outlined a program of action in which a pro-investment policy, leading to a reduction in unemployment, was to play an important role. He planned to reconstruct Piłsudskiego Avenue and Sienkiewicza Street, renovate Ciołkowskiego Street, and build tunnels under Hetmańska Street. He wanted to start organizational preparations for the construction of a bypass for transit traffic bypassing Białystok, planned to renew the public transport fleet, expand the housing estate of municipal blocks on Klepacka Street, and commence work aimed at development of spatial development plans for Białystok. A shopping and cultural center was to be built at the Hay Market, Młynowa Street, and Żelazna Street. He had plans to improve traffic flow on Lipowa Street. He also intended to reallocate funds for social purposes, such as improving equipment in medical clinics. He maintained good relations with both the Catholic Church and the Orthodox Church.

He objected to build a hangar for the Podlaski Border Guard Regional Unit at the Białystok-Krywlany Airfield, instead vowing to develop it into a regional airport.

In September 1994, councilors of the Freedom Union and the Białystok Local Government Club "Left" attacked President Andrzej Lussa for personnel changes in the City Hall. They accused him of lacking specific criteria for assessing individual employees and dismissals for political views. Defending his position, the president emphasized that he has the right to choose his colleagues and that when making dismissals, he is not guided by political considerations but only by the professionalism and usefulness of officials. The local press also attacked Mayor Andrzej Lussa for increasing rents in municipal service premises, and also suspending the sale of these premises. Rental prices for premises in the center of Białystok were equalized. The lease agreement for the "Park" Shopping Center, concluded in 1991 with Ryszard Mazurek, who built the temporary "Park" Shopping Center located between Bohaterów Monte Cassino Street, the central bus station and the train station, was also terminated. The case went to the Provincial Court, which ruled in favour of the City Hall officials. The president was also accused of transferring the former press house on Suraska Street to the Regional Board of the NSZZ "Solidarność" trade union in Białystok. President Andrzej Lussa, explaining his decision, stated that during martial law, the property was confiscated from "Solidarność", and despite a parliamentary act ordering its return, it was not returned, so he implemented it in Białystok. One of the president's last decisions was to transfer a building on Sienkiewicza Street to be used as a shelter for the poor.

On April 13, 1995, Lussa collapsed while performing his duties. In a state of clinical death, he was taken to the intensive care unit of the State Clinical Hospital in Białystok, where he died. He was lying-in-state at the Branicki Palace before being laid to rest at the Farny Cemetery in the city.

He was married to Elżbieta. In 1995, he was posthumously awarded the golden Cross of Merit. A square in Białystok at the intersection of Piłsudskiego Avenue and Branickiego Street was named after him.
