= Seweryn Nowakowski =

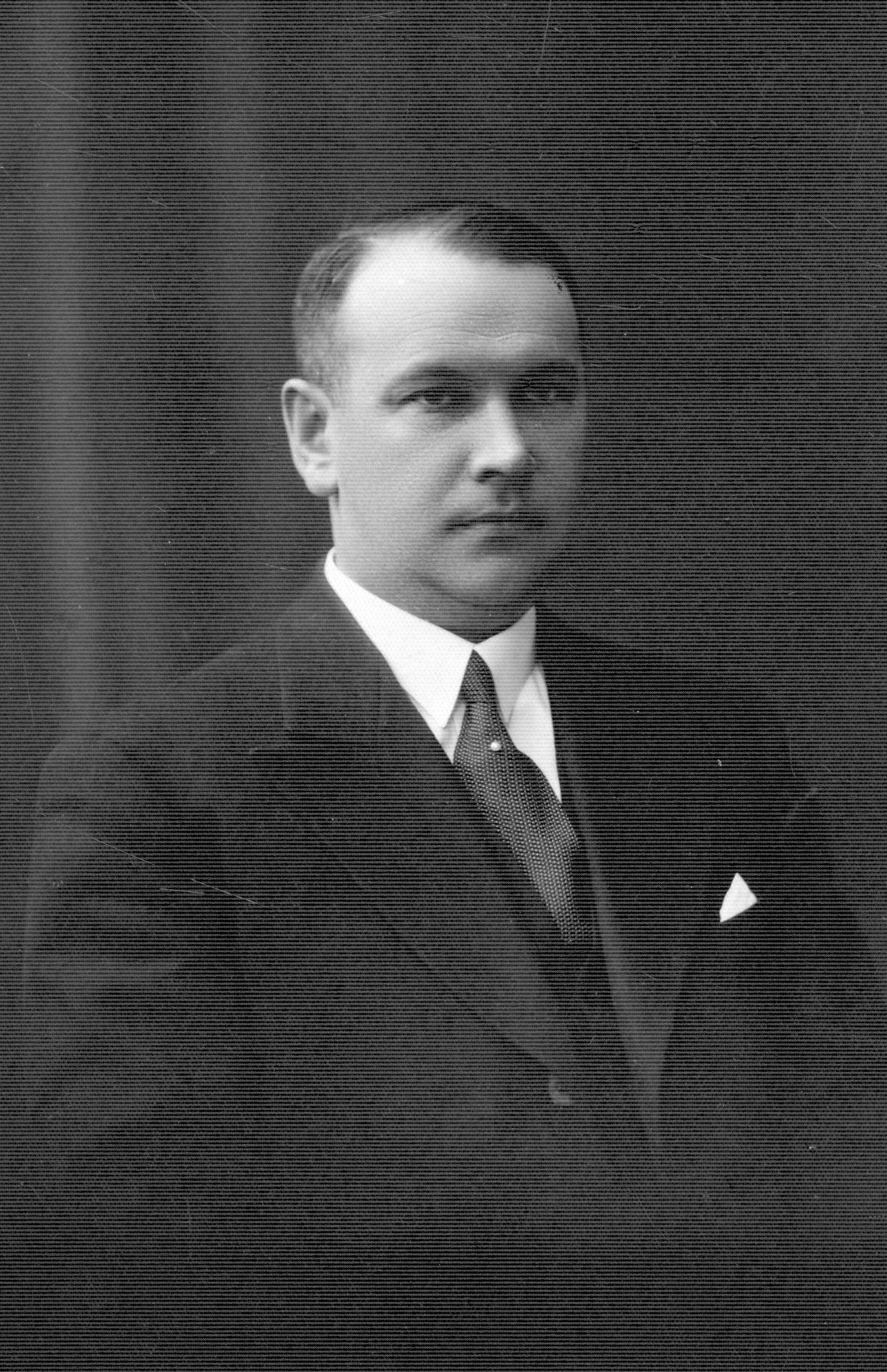

Mayor of Białystok
- In office 12 September 1934 – September 1939
- Preceded by: Wincenty Hermanowski
- Succeeded by: Position abolished Soviet occupation

Personal details
- Born: April 3, 1875 Piotrków Trybunalski, Congress Poland
- Died: Unknown
- Party: Polish Socialist Party
- Education: University of Warsaw; Moscow State University
- Profession: Lawyer, politician
- Awards: Cross of Merit

Seweryn Nowakowski (January 8, 1894 in Piotrków Trybunalski - died probably in 1940) was a Polish politician who served as the last mayor of Białystok prior to the outbreak of the World War II.

== Biography ==
He studied at the Faculty of Law of the University of Warsaw, and after the outbreak of World War I he stayed in Kiev. Then he continued his studies at the Faculty of Law of the Moscow State University. He returned to Poland probably in 1919 with a Red Cross transport and settled in Piotrków Trybunalski. He joined the Polish Socialist Party. He was elected to the position of juror, or a full-time employee in the Municipal Board in Piotrków Trybunalski, which he held until 30 December 1928. From 1927 to November 1930 he was the head of the financial and administrative department.

In the spring of 1931 he was designated by the Prime Minister Walery Sławek for the position of government commissioner in Białystok, arriving to the city in August 1932 and residing in Kraszewskiego Street, he enjoyed the political backing of Voivode Marian Zyndram-Kościałkowski. He remained in this position until September 1934, when he became the city mayor following local government elections. Nowakowski's rival for the position of president was the socialist Stanisław Dubois, who had no chance of winning in the confrontation with the former commissioner. Seweryn Nowakowski became president for a five-year term until 1939. In 1933 he moved with his family to 2 Ogrodowa Street. After becoming mayor of Białystok, from December 1934, he lived together with his family in the modern villa of Dr. Stanisław Bełdowski, head of the infectious diseases hospital, at 11 Mickiewicza Street. His achievements during his two-year term as commissioner were significant. The long-awaited construction of the sewage system began. At the beginning of 1934, a modern market hall was opened in the Fish Market Square, and extensive investments and street repairs, including the reconstruction of the viaduct on Dąbrowskiego Street.

Nowakowski built his authority with a different style of holding office, initially as commissioner, and from 1934 as mayor. Uninvolved in local networks, he created an image of a city manager who listened to the voices of residents. One of the active organizations operating in the city was the Suburb Residents' Association. Its members reported many problems faced by Białystok residents. Nowakowski became involved in resolving them.

Before the 1935 parliamentary elections to the Sejm, he was appointed election commissioner in constituency no. 40.

One of Nowakowski's first decisions was to order the implementation of extraordinary budget cuts. On August 10, 1932, it was reported that due to the poor revenues to the city treasury, the government commissioner ordered all departments of the City Hall to present him with a prepared plan for cutting expenses in the next few days".

Noticing the innovative idea of an outdoor school and a school garden, he ordered that, in order to ensure silkworm breeding in Zwierzyniec, a suitable area of approximately 3,000 square meters be allocated to the management for mulberry plantations and nurseries. Nowakowski's ambitions was to make Białystok, a city, as was particularly emphasized at the time, a European one. Therefore, he paid special attention to the construction of the Marshal Józef Piłsudski People's House, which, at his initiative, was to be a modern municipal theater building. He also directed the construction of Planty Park. On the initiative of Seweryn Nowakowski and Białystok Voivode Stefan Kirtiklis, the regulation of the Biała River began in 1937, alongside the already underway construction of the municipal seweage system, especially in the city center.

Nowakowski maintained good relations with the city's Jewish community. He maintained a close contact with the rabbi of Bialystok, Gedalia Rosenmann.

During the local election held on May 14, 1939 Nowakowski ran on the ticket of the Christian National Economic Electoral Committee, which brought together apolitical economic, professional, educational, and cultural organizations. The committee won the election, gaining 21 seats out of 48 on the council. Nowakowski was again uncontestedly elected by the council for another presidential term, which was to last until 1944. After winning the election, Seweryn Nowakowski and his family went on vacation to Druskininkai. He returned to Białystok on August 4, 1939. The political and military situation became extremely tense, and on August 25, a proclamation signed by Nowakowski appeared in the city. He appealed to residents "in the face of the events we are witnessing, to immediately begin preparing the city for war". Appealing for calm, he stated that construction of shelters should begin immediately, and that work must begin today in various parts of the city. Nowakowski continued his appeal: "Citizens! We call on everyone capable of lifting a shovel to report immediately to the Recruitment Office at 54 Marszałka Piłsudskiego Street (Lipowa Street).

On 1 September 1939, the German invasion of Poland began starting World War II. German bomber squadrons flew over the areas of the then Białystok Voivodeship, the first bombs fell in the area of Białystok railway station and military barracks in the city. From September 4, the Citizen Guard (Polish: Straż Obywatelska), established by Nowakowski, was operating in the city, tasked with supporting and replacement functions for the state police and the army which were evacuated. In night of the 28th to 29 October 1939, he was arrested by the NKVD and shortly imprisoned at the Białystok Prison, from where he was deported to the Soviet Union. Since then, there has been no news about him. His symbolic grave is located at the Powązki Cemetery in Warsaw. He was awarded golden Cross of Merit (November 11, 1934).

== Commemoration ==
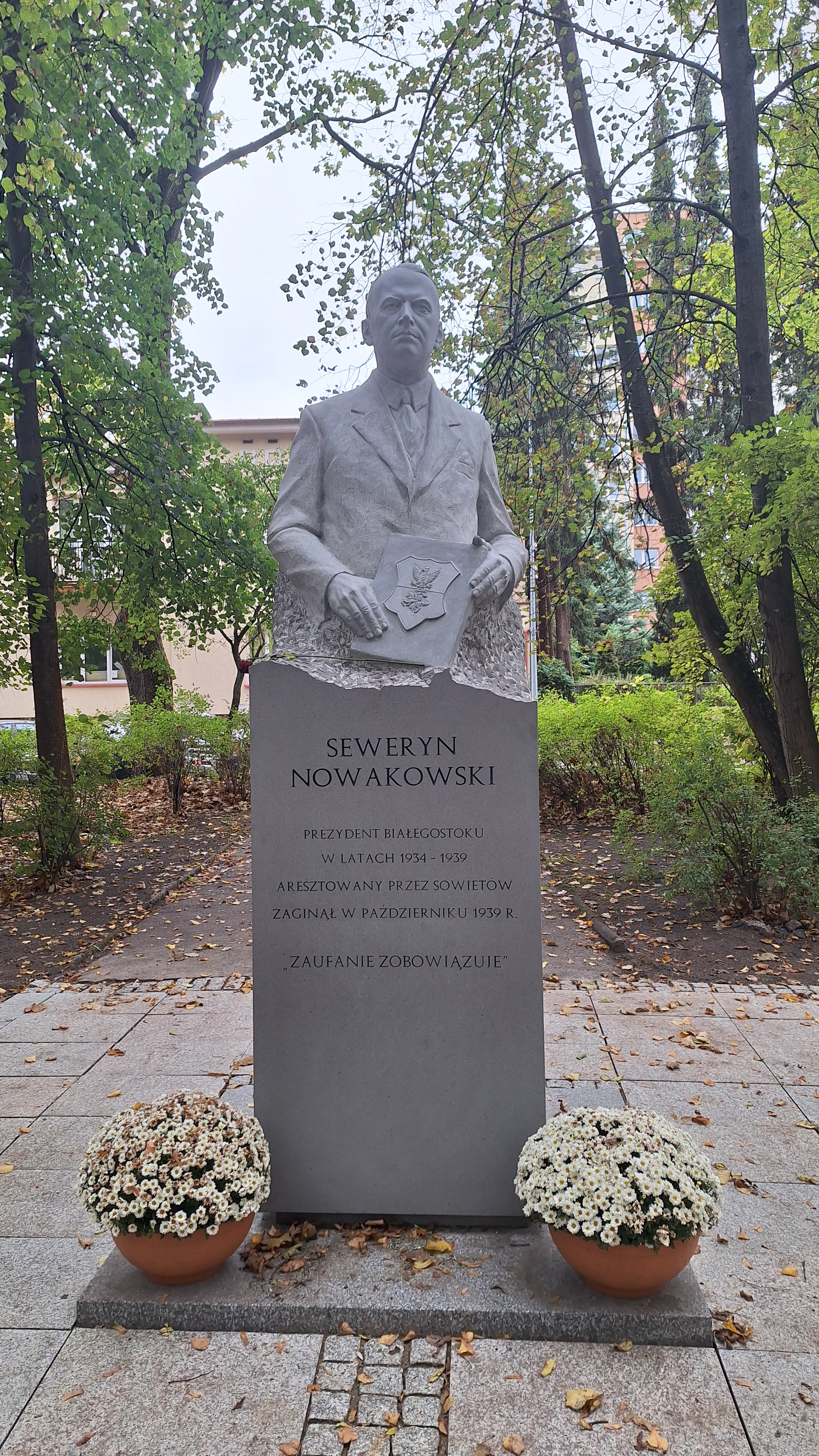
A monument to Nowakowski erected in Planty Park in 2024

On February 19, 2004, a commemorative plaque dedicated to Seweryn Nowakowski was placed on the Presidential Villa in Białystok at Akademicka 26 street.

A street in Wygoda district and roundabout in Piaski district in Białystok is named after Seweryn Nowakowski.

Seweryn Nowakowski was the patron of Public Junior High School No. 6 in Bacieczki district of Białystok before it was liquidated.

As part of the celebrations of the centenary of Poland's independence and in connection with the celebrations of the Year of Seweryn Nowakowski, Ryszard Kaczorowski and Feliks Filipowicz established by the Białystok City Council, from November 22, 2019 to February 16, 2020, the BOK–Centrum im. Ludwik Zamenhofa in Białystok hosted an exhibition dedicated to Seweryn Nowakowski.

On September 16, 2021, the Nowakowski Research Institute was established at the Sybir Museum of Memory in Białystok. The founding act was signed by the Mayor of Białystok Tadeusz Truskolaski, the director of the Museum of Memory of Sybir prof. Wojciech Śleszyński and Krystyna Nowakowska, Nowakowski's daughter-in-law. On September 16, 2024, a monument was unveiled in Białystok in Planty Park, near the villa where Nowakowski once lived.
