= Czaban =

Czaban is a Polish surname meaning "shepherd"

- Jerzy Czaban (born 1947), Polish engineer and local government politician
- Steve Czaban (born 1968), American sports radio personality
