= Zbigniew Zdrojewski =

Polish politician (1950–1996)

Mayor of Białystok
- In office 1986–1989
- Preceded by: Tadeusz Naczas
- Succeeded by: Jerzy Czaban

Personal details
- Born: 16 February 1950 Białystok, Polish People's Republic
- Died: 28 June 1996 (aged 46) Białystok, Poland
- Resting place: Białystok Municipal Cemetery
- Party: Polish United Workers' Party
- Education: University of Warsaw
- Profession: Politician

Zbigniew Zdrojewski (February 16, 1950 – June 28, 1996) was a Polish politician who served as vice mayor of Białystok from 1984–1986 and subsequently Mayor of Białystok from 1986 to 1989.

== Biography ==
Born in 1950, Zdrojewski graduated with a concentration in Management and Organization from the University of Warsaw and the Institute of Organization and Management of the Polish Academy of Sciences. From 1975, he worked at the Branch Organization and Standardization Center at the Voivodeship Board of Municipal and Housing Economy in Białystok and at the Scientific Research Center. In 1978, he was employed at the Białystok City Hall, also serving as a local planner and participant in the experimental program "Social Housing Estate System". He was a member of the executive committee of the POP PZPR (Polish United Workers' Party) at the Białystok City Hall. On January 1, 1980 he became the chairman of the Municipal Planning Commission. On December 20, 1984, he became Vice Mayor of Białystok, and on June 26, 1986, Mayor of the city. A day later, Voivode Marian Gała confirmed his appointment. He held this position until June 1, 1989, when he resigned during the political changes that took part at the end of the communist regime, being succeeded by Jerzy Czaban. In 1987, he was one of the founders of the Ludwik Zamenhof Foundation. In the 1990s, following the end of the communist regime, he worked at an advertising and publishing agency.

He was buried at the Białystok Municipal Cemetery.
