= Andrzej Krzewniak =

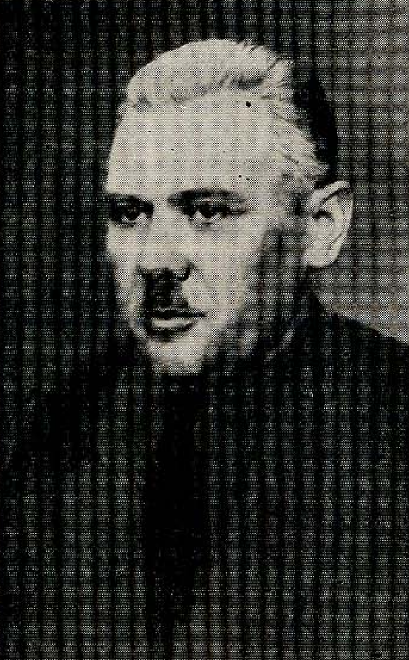

Mayor of Białystok
- In office June 1945 – October 1948
- Preceded by: Witold Wenclik
- Succeeded by: Jadwiga Zubrycka

Personal details
- Born: 30 November 1898 Białystok, Congress Poland
- Died: 27 February 1951
- Party: Polish Socialist Party
- Profession: Locksmith, politician

Andrzej Krzewniak (born November 30, 1898, in Warsaw, died February 27, 1951, in Białystok), alias Bolesław, was a Polish tram driver and trade union activist, socialist who served as mayor of Białystok from 1945 to 1948 and member of the Legislative Sejm from 1947 to 1951.

== Biography ==
He was born into a working-class family. After graduating from technical school, he fought in the Polish Legions and later served in the Polish Army (including during the Polish–Soviet War). After the war, he settled in Lviv (then part of Poland), where he worked as a locksmith in a transportation plant (later as a depot manager). From 1921 to 1939, he was a member of the Polish Socialist Party and also active in the Polish Tram Workers' Trade Union.

During World War II, he was a member of the Home Army, and a member of the Polish Socialist Party – Freedom, Equality, Independence. In July 1944, he found himself in the Lublin Voivodeship, where he began collaborating with the Polish Committee of National Liberation and the re-established Polish Socialist Party, working as a party official in the Lublin, Masovian and Białystok voivodeships. From 1945 to 1947, he served on the PPS Supreme Council, during which he also headed the Provincial Committee of the PPS in Białystok.

In March 1945, he assumed the duties of Vice-Mayor of Białystok, and from June 1945 to October 1948, he served as the city's mayor. In January 1946, he was appointed a member of the State National Council by the Białystok Voivodeship National Council. In 1947, he joined the Legislative Sejm as a representative of Podlasie.

He died after a long illness and is buried at Powązki Cemetery in Warsaw.
