= Bogdan Załuski =

Mayor of Białystok
- In office October 1956 – September 1958
- Preceded by: Roman Woźniak
- Succeeded by: Jerzy Krochmalski

Personal details
- Born: 30 September 1924 Pruzhany, Second Polish Republic
- Died: 28 November 1977 Polish People's Republic
- Party: Polish United Workers' Party
- Profession: Security official, politician
- Awards: Cross of Merit

Bogdan Załuski (born September 30, 1924 in Pruzhany - November 28, 1977) was a Polish politician and security service officer who served as Mayor of Białystok from 1956 to 1958.

== Biography ==
Son of Adam and Rozalia, he was born on September 30, 1924, in Pružany, Polesie Voivodeship..

He completed six years of primary school in Bochnia. In 1939, he began working as a firewood cutter. He worked there until 1942. Threatened with conscription into a forced labor camp by the German occupation authorities, he moved to Kraków, where he worked on a construction site. In 1944, he returned to Bochnia and contacted the local Home Army cell. He served as a liaison there. In January 1945, he began working at the Public Security Office in Bochnia. During this time, he joined the Polish Workers' Party.

From March 1945, he was a clerk and senior clerk at the District Office of Public Security in Bochnia. In 1946, he became an investigative officer in Section II of the 5th Department of the Voivodeship Office of Public Security in Białystok, serving as head of Sections II and V in that office. He rose to the rank of lieutenant. From 1951 to 1956, he held managerial positions within the Provincial National Council in Białystok. From October 1956 to September 1958, he served as chairman of the Presidium of the Municipal National Council, the mayor's title in that period. An activist in the Polish United Workers' Party, he served as a member of the executive of the Municipal Committee of the Polish United Workers' Party in Białystok in the second half of the 1950s.

After resigning as chairman in September 1958, Bogdan Załuski held various positions in national councils. He was chairman of the District National Council in Siemiatycze. In 1966, he graduated from the University of Warsaw with a master's degree in administration. From 1968 to 1973, he worked on the District Board of the Polish Automobile Association in Białystok. He was co-organizer of the "Gwardia" sports club in Białystok, co-organizer of the ski association in Białystok, and vice-chairman of the Voivodeship Board for the Promotion of Physical Culture in Białystok. He was also an active member of the Voluntary Reserve of the Citizens' Militia in Białystok. In 1974, he took up the position of manager of the Białystok Cooperative for the Disabled "Odnowa" in Białystok.

He was buried in the Municipal Cemetery in Białystok. He was twice awarded the Silver Cross of Merit (the second time in 1952).
