= Jadwiga Zubrycka =

Mayor of Białystok
- In office 1949–1952
- Preceded by: Andrzej Krzewniak
- Succeeded by: Roman Woźniak

Personal details
- Born: 24 November 1909 Białystok, Congress Poland
- Died: 6 February 1992 Białystok, Poland
- Party: Polish United Workers' Party
- Profession: Politician
- Awards: Cross of Merit

Jadwiga Zubrycka (born November 24, 1909 in Białystok, died February 6, 1992) was a Polish worker and communist activist who served as Mayor of Białystok, and member of the Sejm of the First Term Sejm (1952–1956).

== Biography ==
From 1932 to 1939 she worked at the Szapiro-Jagłoń factory, where she was active in trade unions. Her husband was involved in the Communist Party of Western Belorussia (arrested in 1936 and executed by the Germans during World War II). During the Soviet occupation, she was a member of the Factory Committee at a textile factory and a delegate to Gorsoviet. From 1942 to 1945, she worked as a seamstress. In 1946, she participated in a trip to the Soviet Union as a representative of Białystok's textile workers where they were received in Moscow by Joseph Stalin, after which she was promoted to director of Textile Factory No. 1. In February 1949, she assumed the duties of chairwoman of the Białystok Municipal National Council the official title of the city's mayor in that period. In 1952, she was delegated to the First Term Sejm in the elections of October 26, 1952, as a representative of the Białystok district. She served on the Municipal Housing and Utilities Committee and was also a member of the Senior Citizens' Council. From 1953 she served as secretary of the provincial board of the Polish–Soviet Friendship Society.

She was awarded the Gold (1954) and Silver (1948), Cross of Merit and the Medal of the 30th Anniversary of People's Poland.

She died in February 1992 and was buried at the Białystok Municipal Cemetery.
