= Michał Ostrowski =

Polish military officer and politician

Mayor of Białystok
- In office 26 January 1928 – 29 October 1928
- Preceded by: Bolesław Szymański
- Succeeded by: Wincenty Hermanowski

Personal details
- Born: September 29, 1873 Białystok, Russian Empire
- Awards: Order of Saint Stanislaus; Order of Saint Anna; Order of Polonia Restituta

Military service
- Allegiance: Kingdom of Poland; Second Polish Republic
- Branch/service: Imperial Russian Army; Polish Army
- Rank: Polkovnik

Michał Ostrowski (1873-?) was a Polish military officer and local government politician who in 1928 served for a short period as the mayor of Białystok.

== Biography ==
He was born on September 29, 1873 in Białystok. He was the son of Karol Ostrowski, probably the same as the owner of the tenement house at 13 Kraszewskiego Street. On March 3, 1891, Ostrowski was accepted to the Officers' Cavalry School in Elizavetgrad. He graduated on September 1, 1893. He served in the 2nd Saint Petersburg Dragoon Regiment. During his service in the Imperial Russian Army, he was awarded the Order of Saint Stanislaus in 1907 and Order of Saint Anna in 1912. In September 1913, he was captain of the 17th Novomirgorod Uhlan Regiment. In 1918, following the regaining of independence and the establishment of the Second Polish Republic he joined the Polish Army and was employed as the head of the renovation commission, which was responsible for purchasing horses for the army. From July 1, 1922 to April 1, 1923, he was the commander of the 18th Pomeranian Uhlan Regiment, which was stationed in Toruń. On May 1, 1923, he was appointed commander of the 4th Cavalry Brigade in Suwałki. From June 1, 1924, he was the first commander of the 8th Cavalry Brigade formed in Wołkowysk. For his service, he was awarded the Polonia Restituta officer's cross.

When, before the local elections scheduled for December 11, 1927, he was included on the list of the United Electoral Committee of Former Military Personnel, he announced his election program in November 1927. He announced among others that he would act "in defense of the dearly purchased rights of Polishness and the actions of the current Government of Marshal Piłsudski against the nefarious work of the camps hostile to us". In the 1927 Polish local elections he was elected to the Białystok City Council. The city council opened a discussion to choose the city president, with Ostrowski's name put in the list, competing against Lejzor Szobfisz. The idea of his appointment was born in military circles and was taken up by the Anti-Aircraft Defense League. It was supported by the Białystok Voivode, Marian Rembowski. Ostrowski managed to win following a heated discussion, as a result of which the motion was defeated. Finally, after two votes he won a majority and became the city president (mayor). His tenure was characterized with constant political quarrels with the city council, with councilors accusing him of concealing financial irregularities, and blaming him for serious irregularities in the construction of the Zdobycz Robotnicza housing estate in Wygoda District, and the unlawful construction of benches in the Constitution of 3 May Park. Following his resignation he departed completely from political life and was temporarily succeeded by his deputy Wolf Hepner until new election was held, in which Wincenty Hermanowski was elected. In Białystok, he lived at 25 Fabryczna Street. After departing from political life, he moved to Wadowice.
