= Krzysztof Jurgiel =

Polish politician (born 1953)

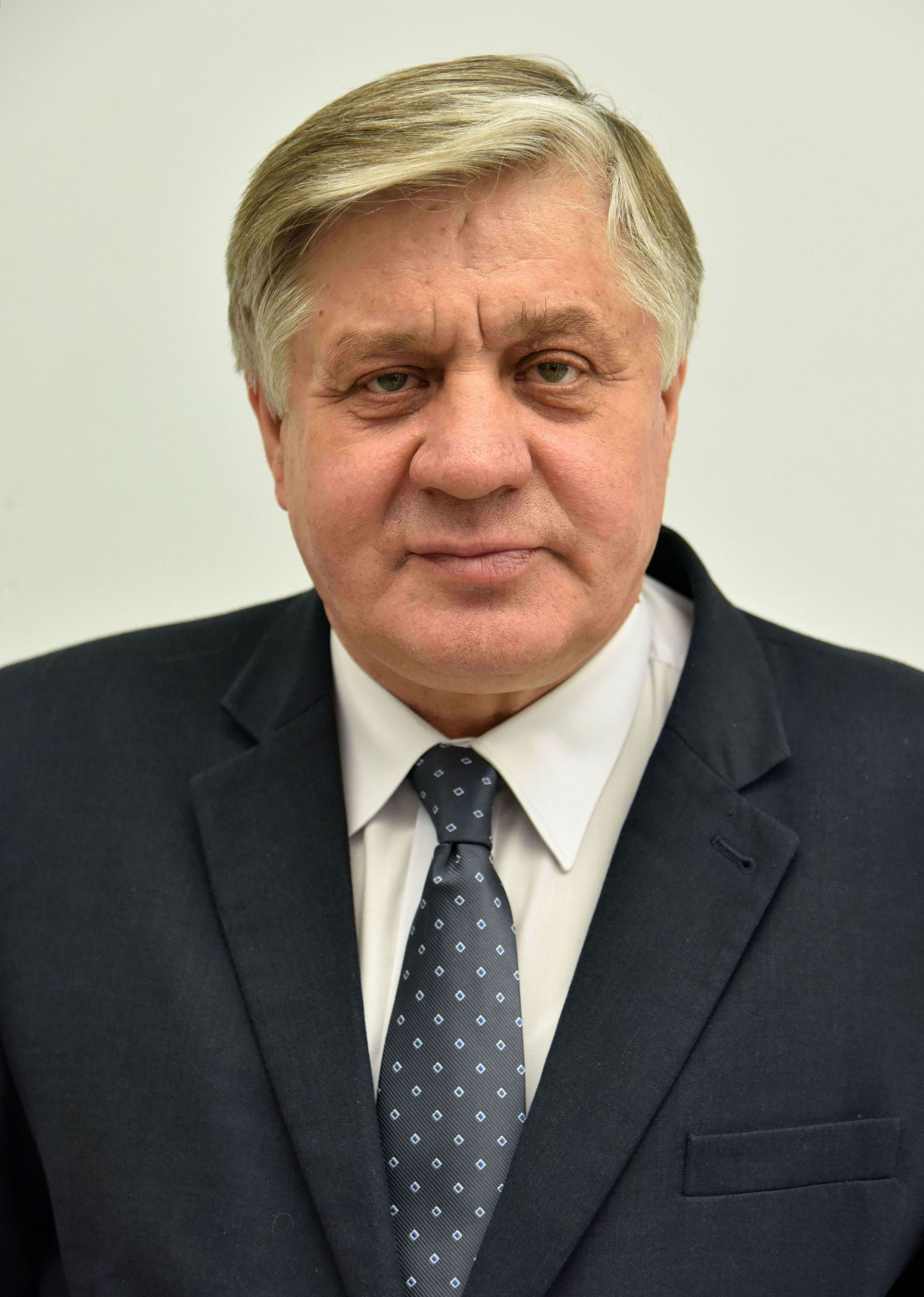

Member of the Sejm
- Incumbent
- Assumed office 25 September 2005
- Constituency: 24 – Białystok

Mayor of Białystok
- In office 1995–1998
- Preceded by: Andrzej Lussa
- Succeeded by: Ryszard Tur

Personal details
- Born: 18 November 1953 (age 72)
- Party: Law and Justice
- Education: Warsaw University of Technology

Krzysztof Jurgiel (born 18 November 1953, in Ogrodniki) is a Polish politician. He is the former Minister of Agriculture and Rural Development in the cabinet of Beata Szydło (from 16 November 2015 to 2018).

== Biography ==
Following the death of Andrzej Lussa, the Białystok City Council chose Jurgiel to be the mayor of Białystok. Krzysztof Jurgiel invited the opposition to collaborate on the development of Białystok. He planned to develop a city development strategy. To this end, a program team was formed, bringing together representatives from various backgrounds. The program assumed rational management of municipal property, solving the problem of the city bypass, increasing the capacity of city roads, developing a housing policy, and transforming Białystok's city center, making it a showcase for the city, restricting vehicular traffic in the city center, constructing municipal apartment blocks on Klepacka Street, developing land for housing in the Bacieczki district, rebuilding the tunnels on Hetmańska Street, and replacing public transport buses. Mayor Jurgiel appointed Marian Blecharczyk, Marek Kozłowski, and Ryszard Tur as his deputies. Maria Borodziuk resigned from her position as treasurer, and Stanisława Kozłowska was appointed in her place. Jurgiel served in his position until 1998.

On November 6, 1998, at the first session of the Podlaskie Voivodeship Sejmik of the first term, its councilors, through Resolution No. 1, appointed Jurgiel as its chairman. Twenty-five councilors from the "Solidarity" Electoral Action club voted in favor of the candidacy, one councilor from the Democratic Left Alliance voted against it; five from the Social Alliance and two from the Freedom Union abstained. As chairman, Krzysztof Jurgiel declared that actions would be taken to equalize the standard of living in the Białystok Voivodeship with the so called Polska 'A'.

On 25 September 2005 he was elected to the Sejm, getting 42,920 votes in the 24th Białystok district, running on the Law and Justice list.

He was also a member of Sejm 1997–2001, Sejm 2001–2005, and Senate 2001–2005.

Since 2019, he has served as a Member of the European Parliament for the Podlaskie and Warmian-Masurian constituency.

== See also ==
- Members of Polish Sejm 2005–2007
