= Lech Rutkowski =

Polish politician

Mayor of Białystok
- In office 1990 – 13 July 1994
- Preceded by: Jerzy Czaban
- Succeeded by: Andrzej Lussa

Personal details
- Born: 5 March 1944 Białystok, Belastok Region
- Party: Solidarity Citizens' Committee
- Other political affiliations: Polish People's Party
- Education: Warsaw University of Technology
- Profession: Politician
- Awards: Cross of Merit

Lech Rutkowski (born March 5, 1944 in Białystok) is a Polish local government politician who served as Mayor of Białystok in 1990–1994.

== Biography ==
He graduated from the Warsaw University of Technology in 1968, after which he worked at the District Geodetic and Cartographic Enterprise, holding, among other positions, the position of director. In 1990, with the support of the Solidarity Citizens' Committee, he became the first non-communist president of Białystok, a position he held until 1994. During his tenure he had to deal with a difficult economic situation resulted from the transition of the country from communist regime to capitalist one. The city was plagued by a high unemployment rate, paralyzing strike of the municipal bus company from May to September 1990. Parallelly, the market in Bema street was liquidated and the garbage was moved to Hryniewicz, water treatment facility was completed and a dozen municipal enterprises were reorganized The newly elected City Council, however, removed Rutkowski from all his positions, accusing him of overly liberal personnel policies toward the left. On the other hand, left-wing councilors attacked him for dismissing their people from their positions and for being too submissive to the clergy.

In 1990–2006, he served four consecutive terms on the city council.

From 1996 to 2003, he headed a branch of the Bank Gospodarki Żywnościowej. In 2003–2005, he was president of the sports club Jagiellonia Białystok, then became honorary chairman of the supervisory board of that club.

In 2004, he ran for the European Parliament on the list of the National Electoral Committee of Voters. In 2006 and 2007, he was elected as a councillor to the Podlaskie regional assembly on behalf of Law and Justice. In 2007, he also became the president of the board of Białostockie Zakłady Graficzne (until 2009). In January 2008, he left PiS, co-founding a new club of councillors, Prawica Podlasia, which entered into a coalition with Civic Platform and Polish People's Party. In 2009, he was a candidate for the European Parliament on behalf of the Right Wing of the Republic. In the 2010 local elections, he unsuccessfully ran for re-election to the regional assembly on the Polish People's Party list (on the recommendation of PR, as part of the electoral agreement between these parties). In the 2011 parliamentary election, he was a candidate for the Sejm on the Right Wing list in the Białystok electoral district. In the local elections in 2014, he also unsuccessfully ran for the provincial assembly from the PiS list (again as a PR candidate).

An activist of the Catholic Intelligentsia Club, he was the president of the KIK in Białystok.

In 2005, for his services in local government, he was awarded the golden Cross of Merit by President Aleksander Kwaśniewski.
