= Jerzy Czaban =

Polish engineer and local politician

Mayor of Białystok
- In office 21 August 1989 – 25 June 1990
- Preceded by: Zbigniew Zdrojewski
- Succeeded by: Lech Rutkowski

Personal details
- Born: 27 March 1947 Surażkowo, Polish People's Republic
- Party: Solidarity Citizens' Committee
- Education: Białystok Higher School of Engineering
- Profession: Engineer, politician

Jerzy Czaban (born 27 March 1947) is a Polish engineer and local government politician who served as Mayor of Białystok in 1989–1990.

== Biography ==
He was born on March 27, 1947 in Surażkowo near Supraśl. He graduated from high school in Białystok and the Higher School of Engineering in Białystok. For 8 years he worked at Mechanical Plants of the Białystok Construction Ceramics Company (Polish: Zakładach Mechanicznych Białostockiego Przedsiębiorstwa Ceramiki Budowlanej), then for 12 years he was the director of this company. On June 19, 1989, the Presidium of the Municipal National Council presented the candidacies of Jerzy Czaban and Jan Gierasimiuk for the mayor of Białystok. In the vote, by a large majority (67 out of 76 councillors present supported his candidacy), Czaban won the election. On July 7, 1989, voivode Marian Gała appointed him to the position of mayor of Białystok. He assumed his duties on August 21, 1989. During his short tenure he had to face difficult economic situation resulted from the transition of the country from communist regime to capitalist one. During his term, the spatial development plan for the city center of Białystok was adopted, and discussions were held on changing the function of the market on Bema Street, where the Jewish Cemetery was located. Resolutions were passed on the spatial development of the Wysoki Stoczek, Skorupy, Jaroszówka, and Bacieczki districts of the city.

In June 1990 he was nominated for this position again by some activists of the Citizens' Committee, but he lost in the vote at the Białystok City Council to Bronisław Niepsuj, with Lech Rutkowski finally succeedinhg him. He is a specialist in public procurement and conducts training in this field.
