= Aleksander Czuż =

Polish politician (1936–2026)

Mayor of Białystok
- In office 1972–1981
- Preceded by: Zygmunt Bezubik
- Succeeded by: Tadeusz Naczas

Personal details
- Born: 24 June 1936 Rogawka, Poland
- Died: 21 February 2026 (aged 89)
- Party: Democratic Left Alliance
- Other political affiliations: Polish United Workers' Party
- Education: University of Warsaw
- Profession: Administrator, politician

Aleksander Czuż (24 June 1936 – 21 February 2026) was a Polish politician and civil servant who served as the Mayor of Białystok, a member of the Podlaskie Voivodeship Sejmik and as a member of the 4th term of the Sejm. Initially a member of the Polish United Workers' Party during the existence of the communist regime, he later joined the Democratic Left Alliance.

== Life and career ==
Aleksander Czuż was born on 24 June 1936, the son of Jan and Wiera Czuż. He graduated in administration from the University of Warsaw. From 1953 to 1956, he was a member of the Union of Polish Youth (a member of its district government). From 1955 until its dissolution, he was a member of the Polish United Workers' Party (a member of the executive of its city committee from 1975 to 1981 and a member of its provincial committee from 1973 to 1981). From 1953, he worked in local administration. He was employed on the presidium of the District National Council in Siemiatycze and served as chairman of the councils in Dąbrowa Białostocka and Sokółka. From 1972 to 1981, he served as mayor of Białystok. He later headed the provincial planning commission and served as deputy voivode of Białystok Voivodeship from 1985 to 1990.

He was a councillor in the Podlaskie Voivodeship Sejmik from 1998 to 2001 on behalf of the Democratic Left Alliance. Following the 2001 parliamentary election he served as a member of the Sejm of the 4th term representing the Democratic Left Alliance, elected in the Białystok constituency. In 2005, he did not seek re-election and retired.

Czuż died on 21 February 2026, at the age of 89.
