= Transport in Białystok =

This is a sub-article to Białystok

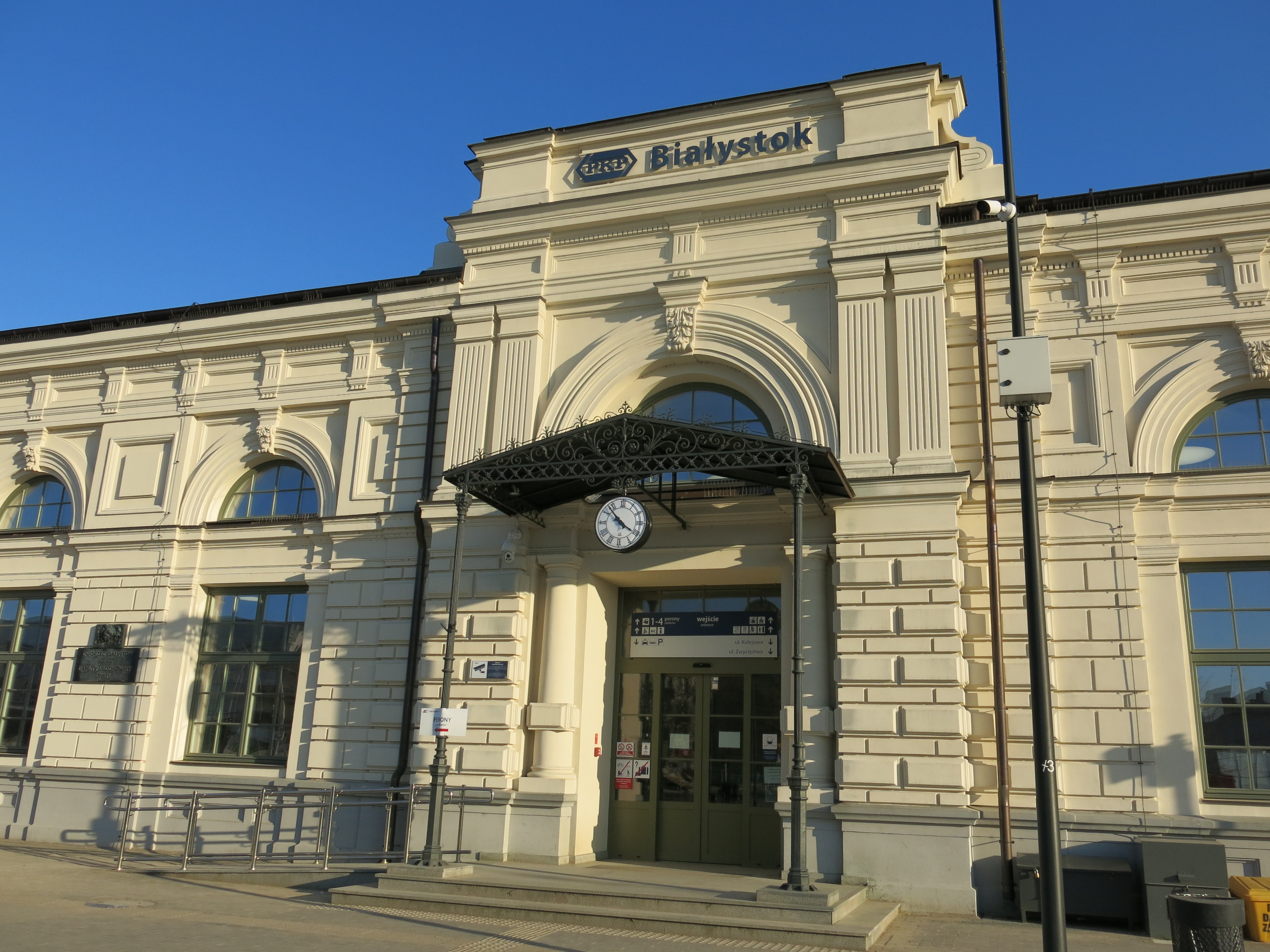
The main railway station in Białystok (2024)

Białystok is, and has been for centuries, the main hub of transportation for the Podlaskie Voivodeship and the entire northeastern section of Poland. It is a major city on the European Union roadways (Via Baltica) and railways (Rail Baltica) to the Baltic Republics and Finland. It is also a main gateway of trade with Belarus due to its proximity to the border and its current and longstanding relationship with Hrodno, Belarus. Passenger trains do connect from Suwałki, Hrodno and Lithuania to Warsaw and the rest of the European passenger network. An extensive public transportation system is provided within the city by three bus services, but no tram or subway exists.

A civil airport, Białystok-Krywlany Airport, lies within the city limits, but does not provide regularly scheduled service.

== History ==
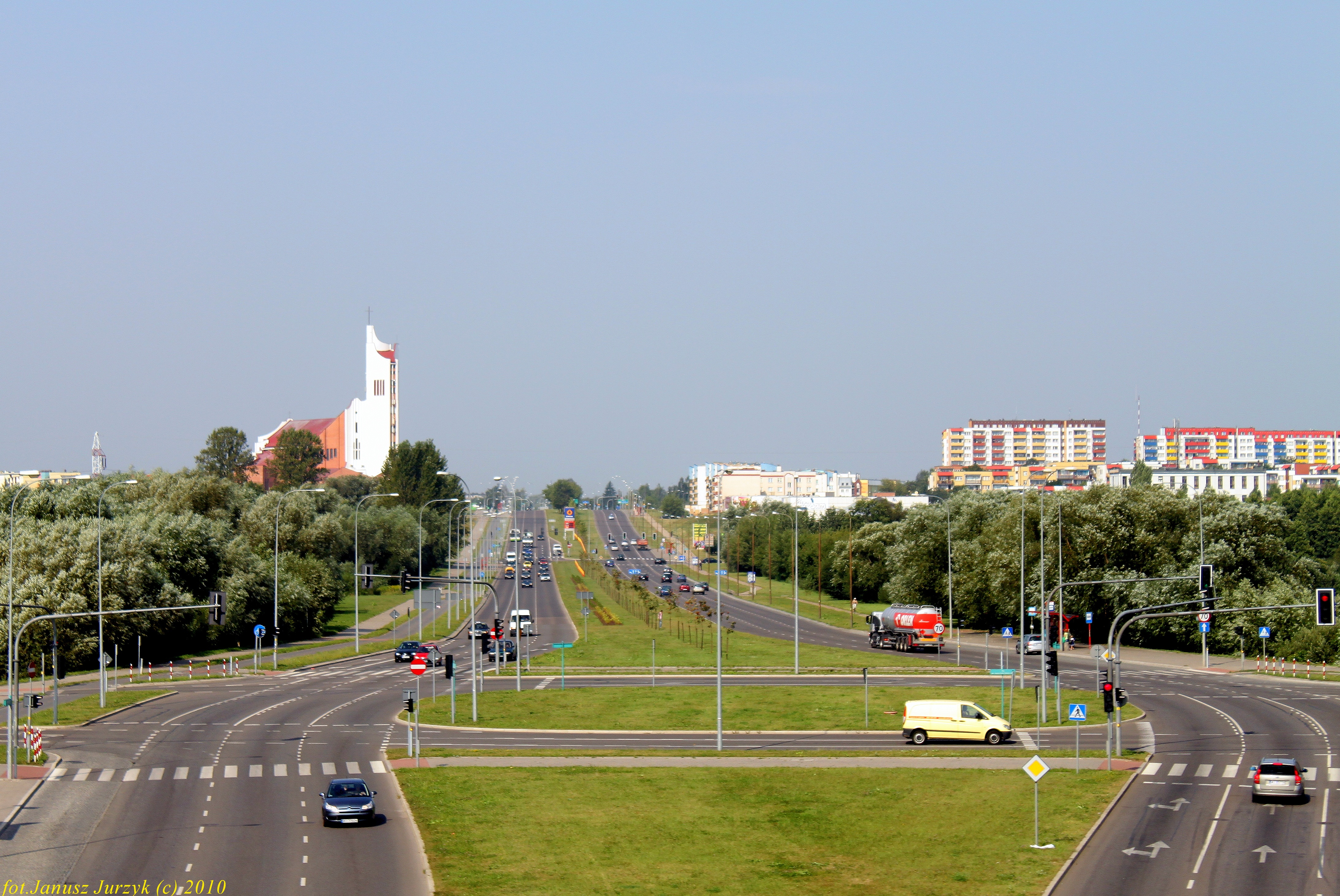
Słoneczny Stok

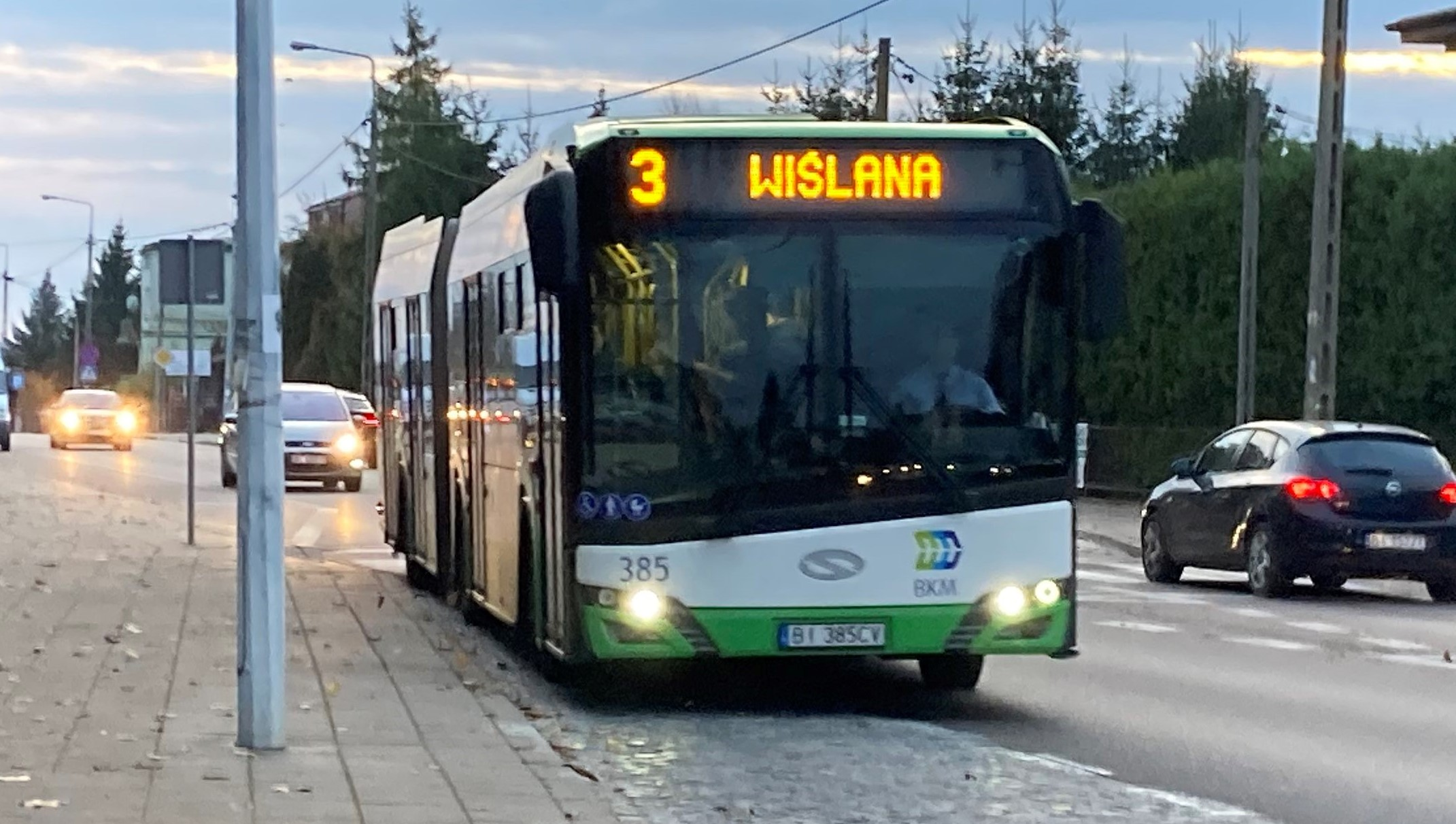
Solaris Urbino 12

Before World War II Białystok had a horse tram network. After the war, plans for the electrification of the lines proved too costly and the lines were pulled down. Since then buses have been the only means of public transportation. There are plans to develop a rapid city rail system in the near future, using the existing railways within the city limits, which will improve the reliability of public transport.

== Roads and highways ==
The National Roads (Polish: Droga krajowa) running through Białystok:

- DK 8 / E67: Budzisko (Polish–Lithuania border) – Białystok – Warsaw – Wrocław – Kudowa-Zdrój (Czech–Polish border)
- DK 19: Rzeszów – Lublin – Bielsk Podlaski – Białystok – Kuźnica (Belarus–Polish border)
- DK 65: Gołdap (Russia–Polish border)-Ełk-Białystok-Bobrowniki (Belarus-Polish border)

The expressways (Polish: Droga ekspresowa) near Białystok:

- S 8 / E67: Białystok – Warsaw – Wrocław
- S 19 (projected): Rzeszów – Lublin – Bielsk Podlaski – Białystok – Kuźnica (Belarus–Polish border)

The Voivodeship roads (Polish: Droga wojewódzka) running through Białystok:

- DW 676: Porosły - Białystok - Supraśl - Krynki
- DW 678: Białystok - Wysokie Mazowieckie
- DW 669: Narodowych Sił Zbrojnych Street
- DW 675: Tysiąclecia Państwa Polskiego Avenue (Polish: aleja Tysiąclecia Państwa Polskiego)

In Białystok Country (Polish: powiat białostocki) there are also Poviat roads (Polish: Droga powiatowa) which connect Białystok with other towns in the area: (Note: The mentioned roads don't pass through the city)

Poviat roads
- Poviat Road 1431 B: Białystok (42 Pułku Piechoty Street) - Sowlany
- Poviat Road 1432 B: Białystok (Ciołkowskiego and Baranowicka streets) - Zielona,
- Poviat Road 1483 B: Białystok (Filipowicza) - Hryniewicze
- Poviat Road 1484 B: Białystok (Mickiewicza Street) - Stanisławowo
- Poviat Road 1485 B: Białystok (Plażowa Street) - Dojlidy Górne
- Poviat Road 1493 B: Białystok (Wiosenna Street) - Olmonty
- Poviat Road 1535 B: Białystok (Popiełuszki, Hetmańska and Wierzbowa Streets) - Choroszcz
- Poviat Road 1550 B: Białystok (Niewodnicka, Meksykańska, Nowosielska and Elewatorska streets) - Klepacze - Niewodnica Kościelna,
- Poviat Road 1559 B: Białystok - Kleosin

== Public transport ==
Bialystok is the largest city in Poland that has only one form of public transit (bus). There is an extensive bus network that covers the entire city. Tickets can be bought using ticket machines mounted in the buses or in advance, they can be bought in newsagents, convenience stores, supermarkets and designated ticket retail points.

There are 30 city lines and 20 metropolitan lines served by 3 bus operators partially owned by the municipality - KPKM, KPK and KZK. Each share approximately a third of the lines and the bus fleet.

=== History ===
One of the first means of urban transport were demobilized trucks owned by Miejski Zakład Komunikacyjny (MZK) in Białystok, which existed after Second World War and the establishment of the People's Republic of Poland. In 1954, this company was transformed into a Municipal Transport Company, MPK Bialystok, maintaining vehicles from Chausson, Star, Mavag, San, Autosan, ZIS and Jelcz in operation, and in the 1980s Ikarus was also the first articulated bus with the nidel 280.

A strike began on May 13, 1991. Employees demanded the resignation of the director, salary increases and discussions on the ownership transformations of the company. The legal patron Jerzy Korsak (then owner of the only private law office in Białystok, now a member of the Supreme Lawyer's Council) came to the strikers and convinced them that in order to dismiss the director, the company had to be dissolved.

In February 2004, the functions of the Municipal Service Department were taken over by the Road and Transport Authority (ZDiT), and in June 2006 the Department of Urban Transport (WTM). In March 2007, the Urban Transport Department was merged with the Municipal Roads Department, resulting in the Department of Roads and Transport (DDT). Since the beginning of 2007, the name Białostocka Komunikacja Miejska has been used in relation to public transport in Białystok. Since 2010, the role of organizer of public transport has been the Authority of Bialystok Municipal Transport (BKM) (Polish: Zarząd Białostockiej Komunikacji Miejskiej).

On early 2016 there were calls from the city council to unite the 3 bus operators as it is costly for the city to own 3 different companies more or less with the same size who perform the same tasks. The mayor replied that this model works well and no further action was taken.

In 2020 ticket machines were installed in BKM buses.

=== Trams ===
Horse-drawn trams existed in the city for merely 20 years, between 1895 and 1915, but most of the infrastructure was damaged during the World War I. In the course of its operation the network consisted of 3 lines. The interwar period seen attempts to revive the system, but those never materialised.

Currently, Białystok is one of the most populous cities in Poland without a tram network. In 2019, the Sobieski Institute published a report outlining potential routes consisting of 25 kilometres (16 miles) of tracks. City officials cited extensive bus network and high costs of implementing a tram system as the main factor preventing its implementation.

== Rail transport ==
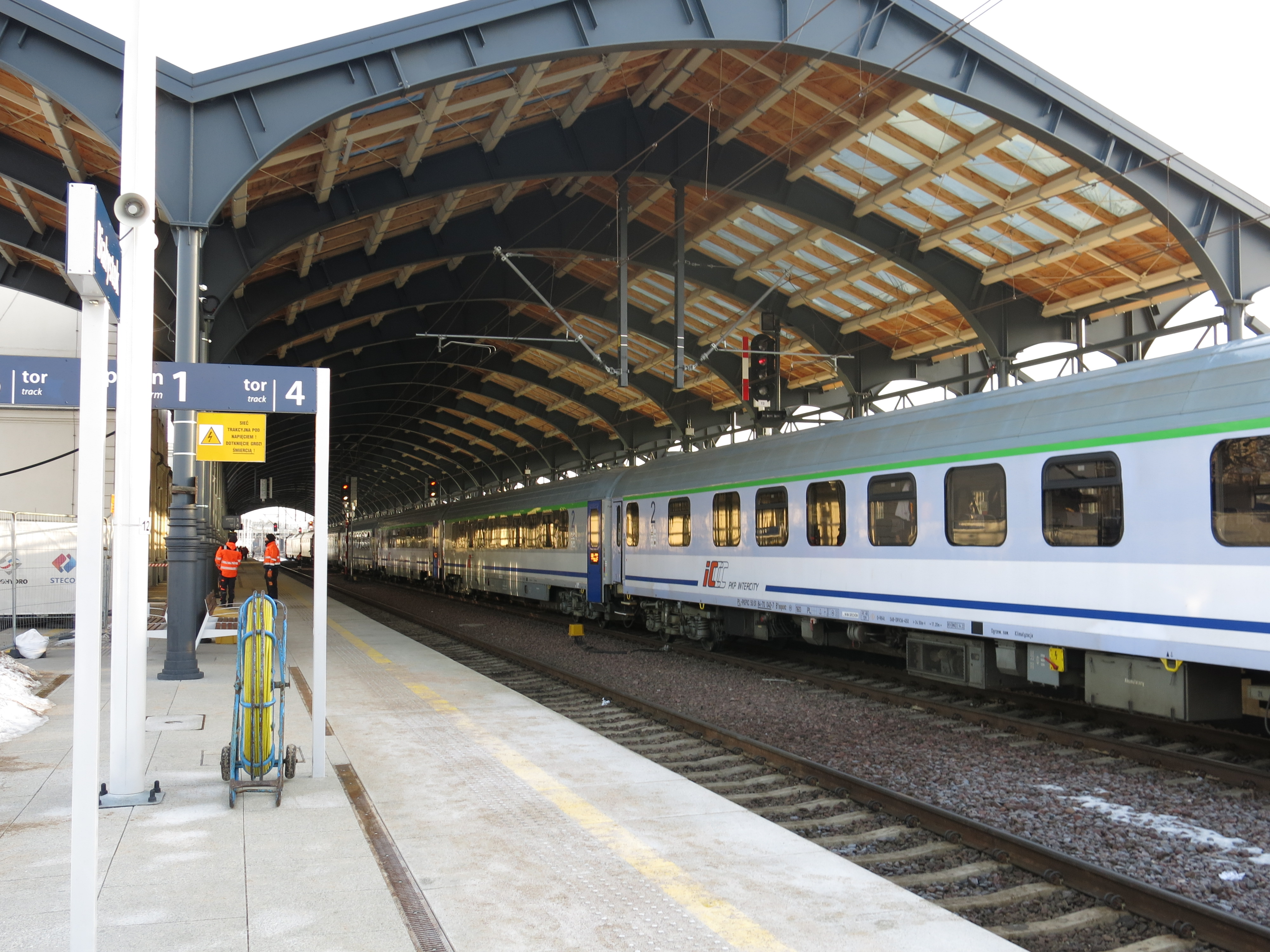
Białystok railway station in 2024

The main railway station is Białystok railway station and passenger services are provided by two rail service providers:

- PKP Intercity - intercity passengers trains (express, intercity, eurocity, hotel and TLK)
- Polregio - runs only regional passenger trains financed by the voivodeship. Passenger trains are mostly run using electrical multiple units (on electrified lines) or rail buses.

Polregio provides service on the following routes:

- Białystok - Waliły (periodically)
- Białystok - Sokółka - Augustów - Suwałki
- Białystok - Sokółka - Kuźnica
- Białystok - Mońki - Grajewo - Ełk
- Białystok - Szepietowo/Czyżew/Małkinia
- Białystok - Hajnówka - Czeremcha - Siemiatycze - Siedlce
- Białystok - Bielsk Podlaski - Czeremcha (Connects to Hajnówka - Siedlce service)
- Białystok - Łapy - Śniadowo - Ostrołęka

Białystok has also direct connections with other cities in northern Poland such as Gdańsk and Olsztyn.

== Intercity bus ==
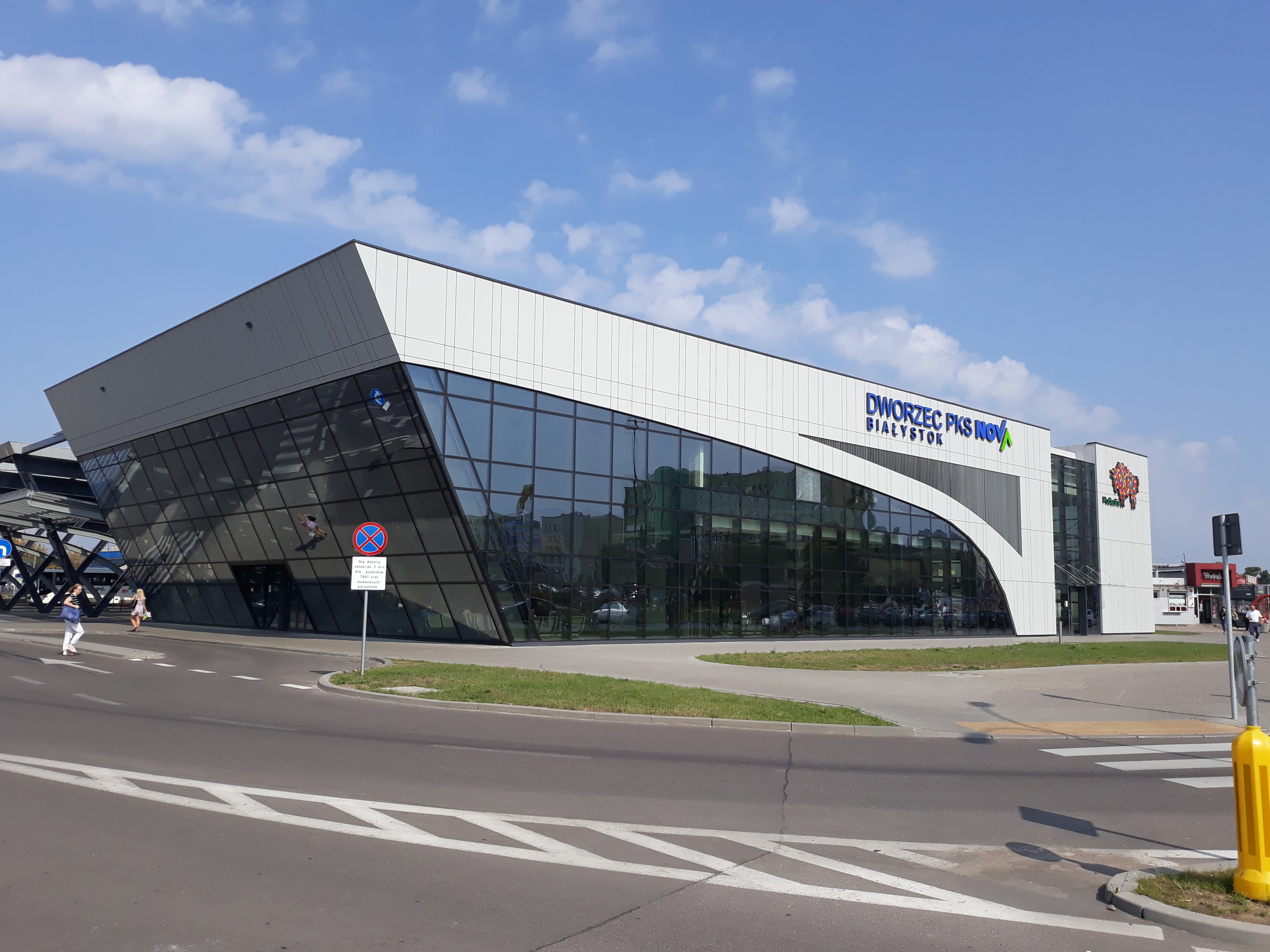
Central bus station of Bialystok

PKS Nova operates coaches to most major cities in Poland.

== Air transport ==
Currently, the nearest airport to Białystok is a regional airport, Hrodna Airport in Hrodna, Belarus. Hrodna only provides domestic service within Belarus. The closest international airport to Białystok is Warsaw Frederic Chopin Airport in Warsaw.

Białystok-Krywlany Airport lies within city limits. It is currently used only by Aeroklub Białostocki, a sports and recreational flying association, and by private airplanes.

There were plans of construction a new regional airport, Białystok-Saniki Airport 27 km west-northwest of Białystok in the village of Saniki, Gmina Tykocin at 2010.
