= Tadeusz Truskolaski =

Polish economist and politician

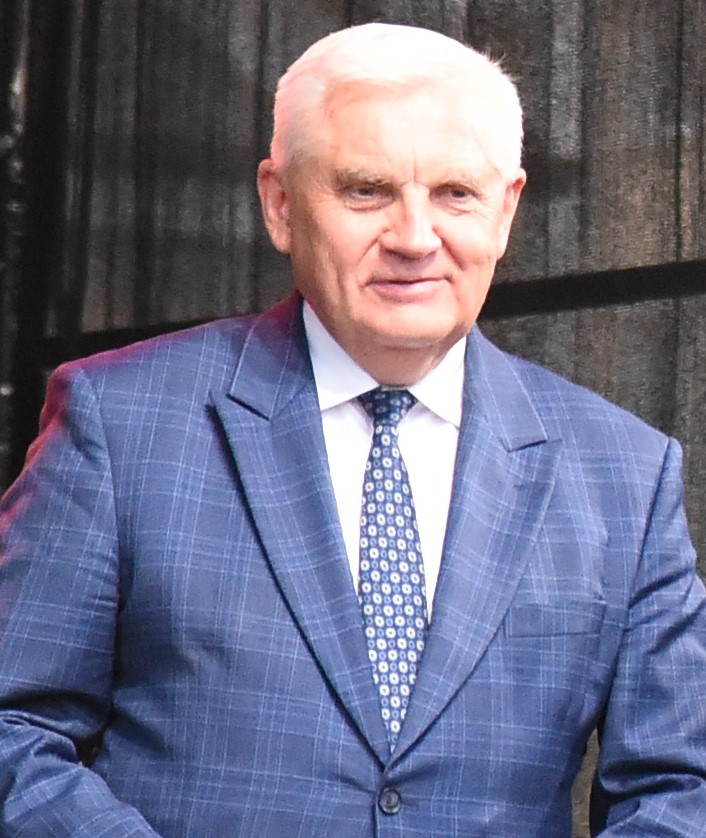
- Truskolaski in 2024

Mayor of Białystok
- Incumbent
- Assumed office 5 December 2006
- Preceded by: Ryszard Tur

Personal details
- Born: April 10, 1958 (age 68) Stare Kapice, Poland
- Party: Independent (Supported by the Civic Platform)
- Spouse: Ewa Truskolaska
- Children: 2 (Krzysztof Truskolaski)
- Education: Białystok branch of the University of Warsaw
- Profession: Politician, economist
- Awards: Cross of Merit

Tadeusz Truskolaski (born 10 April 1958) is a Polish economist and politician. An independent politician supported by the Civic Platform (Platforma Obywatelska), he has been the president (mayor) of the Polish city of Białystok since 5 December 2006, succeeding Ryszard Tur of the Christian National Union.

Since 2011 he is a member of the European Alliance Group at the European Committee of the Regions.

== Biography ==
=== Academic career ===
Descended from the Polish nobility officially extinguished in 1921, his is one of 530 family names which traditionally bear the Ślepowron coat of arms. After graduation he began work as a university teacher. In 1996 he earned a doctorate in economic sciences at the Białystok branch of the University of Warsaw. His Ph.D. thesis was Transport planning as a factor in the development of cities in Northeastern Poland. On 3 April 2007 he was habilitated at the University of Białystok after defending a second dissertation entitled Transport and dynamics of economic growth in the Southeastern Baltic. He is an author of about 70 papers on economics.

=== Politics ===
He was employed by Rządowe Centrum Studiów Strategicznych (Government Centre for Strategic Studies) where he worked on the regional planning of Poland. He directed the Department of Regional Politics in Marshal's Office of Podlaskie Voivodeship, where he obtained 52 million euros from the European Union's PHARE program to help ease Poland's accession to the EU. He is an advisor to the Minister of Regional Development.

In the 2006 Polish local elections he ran for mayor of the city of Białystok as an independent candidate endorsed by the Civic Platform. In the first round of the elections he received 49% of the votes (42,889 votes altogether). In the later runoff he defeated his rival Marek Kozlowski from the Law and Justice (Prawo i Sprawiedliwość) party, receiving 67% of the votes cast (53,018 votes). He was sworn-in as mayor on 5 December 2006.

In the 2010 Polish local elections, he was re-elected (also as a non-party candidate from Civic Platform), winning in the first round with support of 68.53% (64,909 votes).

In the 2014 Polish local elections, he was elected president of Białystok for the third time, running with his own electoral committee with the support of Civic Platform. In the first round he received 49.37% of the votes, while in the second round he received 63.76% of the votes, winning over the PiS candidate Jan Dobrzyński.

In the 2018 Polish local elections, he successfully ran for re-election on the endorsement of the Civic Coalition, receiving 56.21% of the votes in the first round.

In the 2024 Polish local elections, he successfully ran for re-election on the endorsement of the Civic Coalition, receiving 53.32% of the votes in the first round, winning a fifth term.

=== Esperanto activities ===
In August 2007 Truskolaski delivered a speech at the 92nd World Congress of Esperanto in Yokohama. In his speech he urged attendees to commemorate the 150th anniversary of the birth of the originator of Esperanto by attending the 2009 World Congress in Ludwik Zemenhof's home town of Białystok. The mayor cited Białystok as "a place which is the melting pot of different nations, religions, cultures, customs and traditions" and "an example of the integration of ethnic and religious groups, a meeting place for Poles, Belarusians, Jews, Lithuanians, Germans, Russians and Tartars." This multi-ethnicity, he said, was one reason for Zamenhof to develop the universal language of Esperanto.

That 94th World Congress of Esperanto duly began the last weekend of July at the University of Białystok, with about 2,000 participants, including French architect Louis-Christophe Zaleski-Zamenhof, a grandson of Esperanto's founder and a strong proponent of the Esperanto movement. The attendees were again greeted in the Esperanto language by Mayor Truskolaski and the Deputy Mayor Alexander Sosna, who had served as chair of the World Congress organizing committee.

Aside from Polish, Truskolaski also speaks both English and Russian. He has a wife Ewa, a daughter Emilia and a son Krzysztof.

== Selected publications ==
- Podstawy finansów przedsiębiorstw ("Basics of finance") Białystok Univ. Press, 2002. ISBN 83-89031-36-1
- Transport a dynamika wzrostu gospodarczego w południowo-wschodnich krajach bałtyckich ("Transport and dynamics of economic growth in the southeastern Baltic") Białystok Univ. Press, 2006. ISBN 978-83-7431-081-9
