= Majdan, Ostrołęka County =

Majdan
- Village
- Location within Poland
- Coordinates: 53°10′N 21°16′E
- Country: Poland
- Voivodeship: Masovian
- County: Ostrołęka
- Gmina: Baranowo

Majdan (Polish pronunciation: [ˈmajdan]) is a village in the administrative district of Gmina Baranowo, within Ostrołęka County, Masovian Voivodeship, in east-central Poland.
