= Farny Cemetery in Białystok =

Catholic cemetery in Poland

Farny Cemetery Cmentarz Farny w Białymstoku
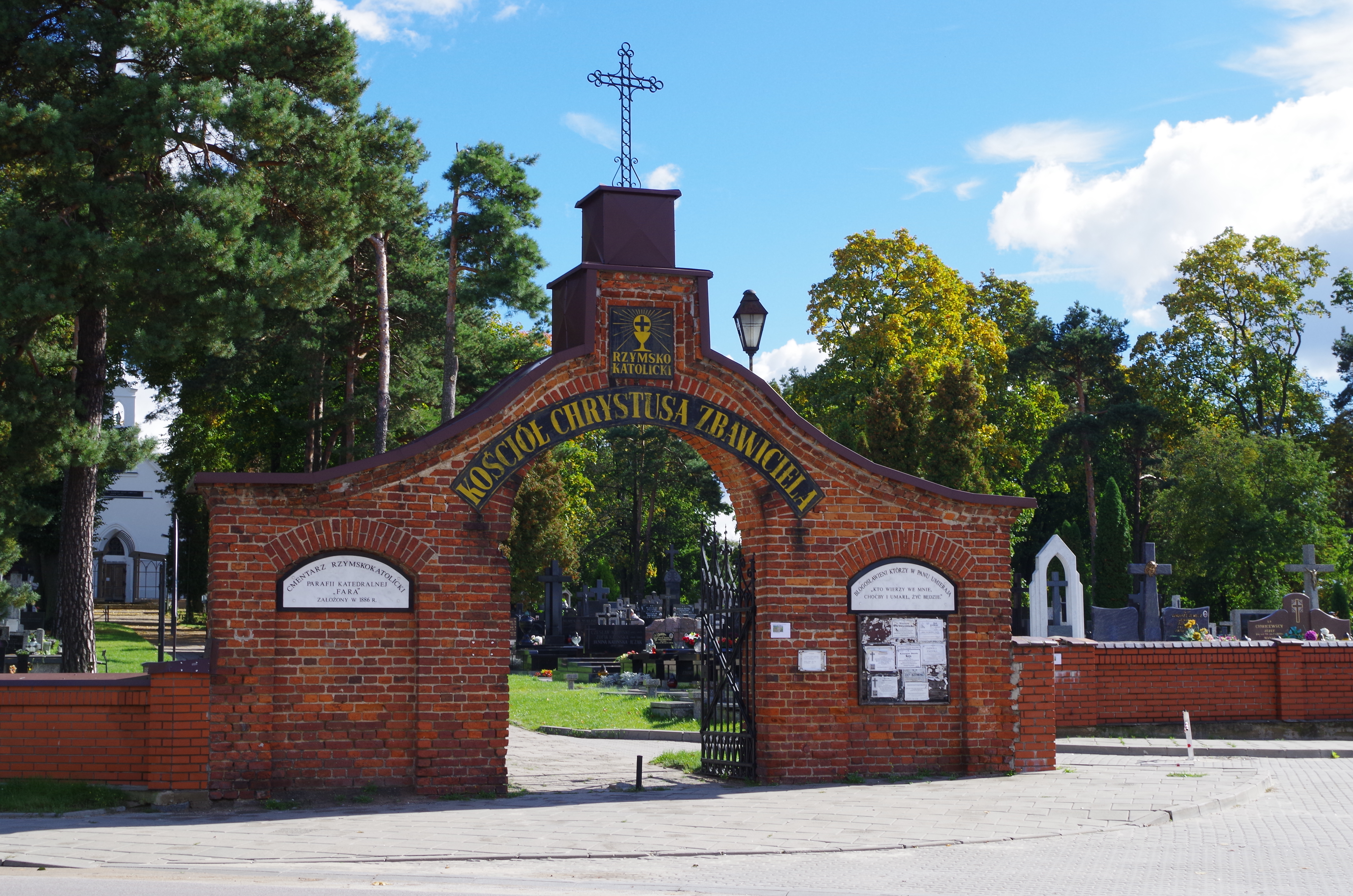
- Interactive map of Farny Cemetery; Cmentarz Farny w Białymstoku

Details
- Established: 1886
- Location: Białystok
- Country: Poland
- Coordinates: 53.152766°N 23.197118°E
- Type: Civil
- Owned by: Catholic Church
- No. of graves: 24,441
- No. of interments: 62,505

Farny Cemetery in Białystok (Polish: Cmentarz Farny w Białymstoku) is a Catholic cemetery. It is one of the oldest cemeteries in Białystok, and is located in the Wygoda district.

== History ==
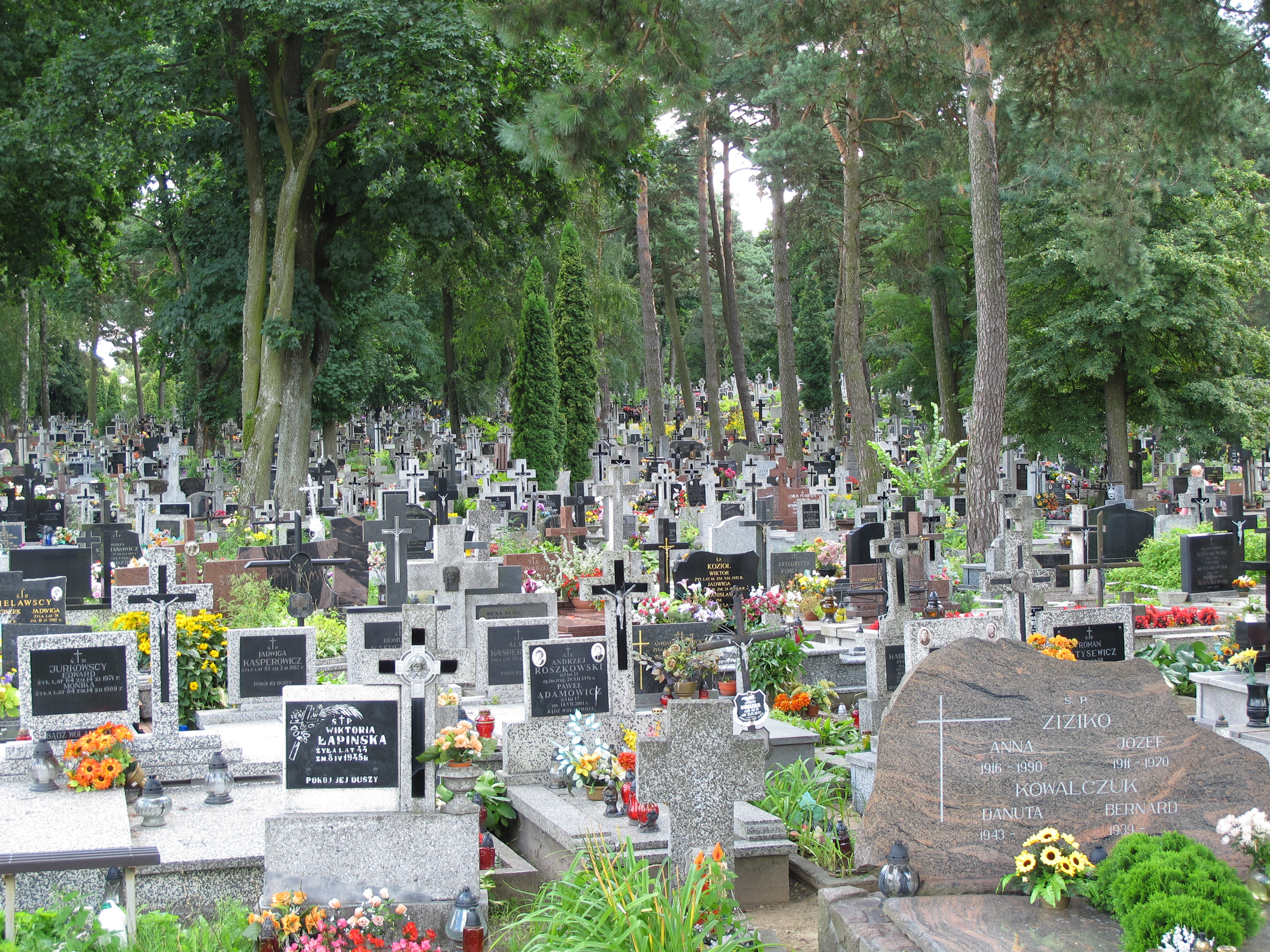
View of the cemetery

It was founded in 1886 by priest dean Wilhelm Szwarc. In 1888, a chapel was built in the cemetery opposite the main gate.

The cemetery is home to, among others, the soldiers who participated in the Polish–Soviet War and World War II.

== Notable burials ==
A number of notable people from the city's history were buried in the cemetery, such as Andrzej Lussa and Józef Karol Puchalski.
