= Legislative Sejm (1947–1952) =

Polish parliament from 1947 to 1952

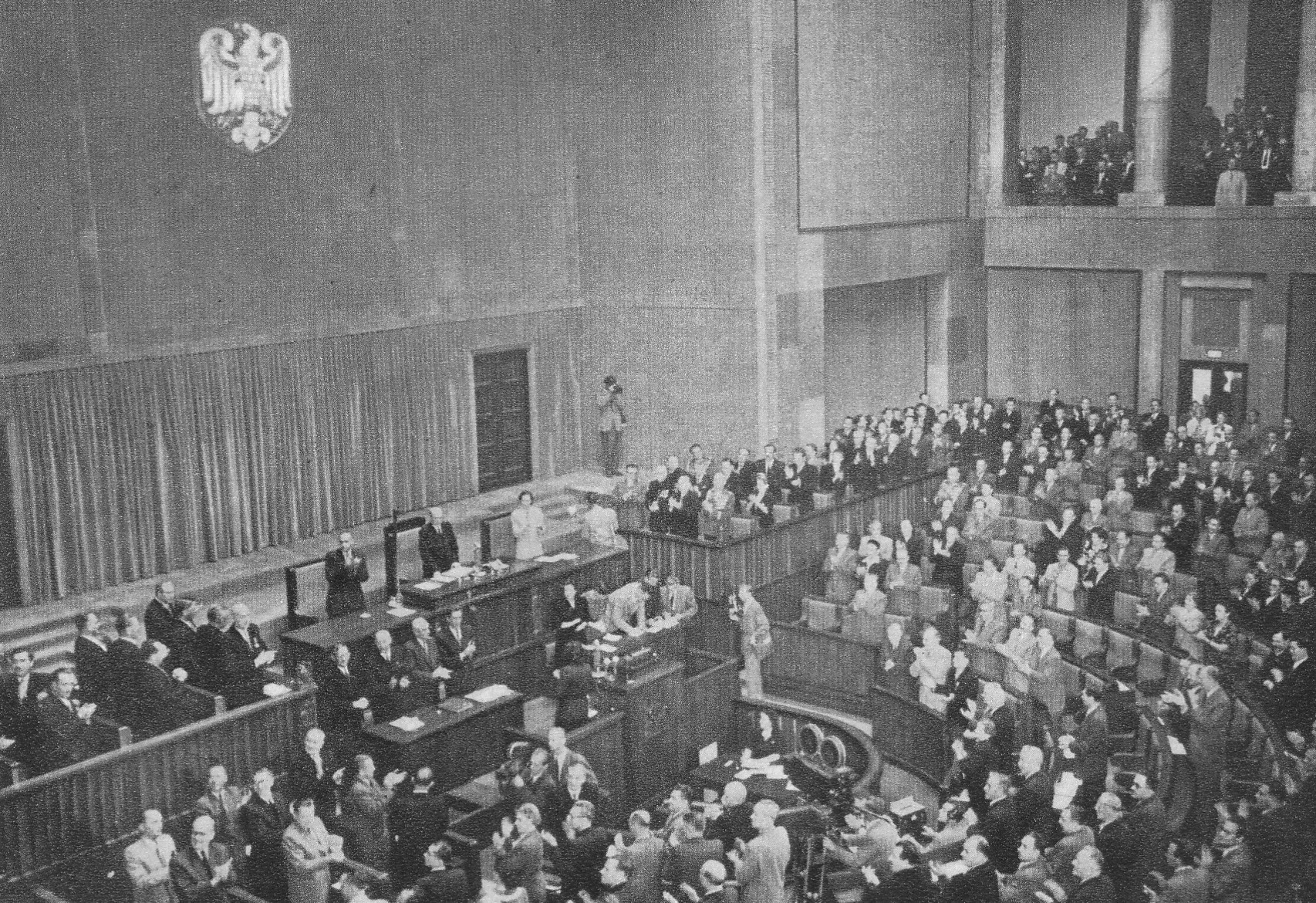
Adoption of the Constitution of the Polish People's Republic by the Legislative Sejm, July 22, 1952

Legislative Sejm (Polish: Sejm Ustawodawczy) was the first national parliament (Sejm) of the newly created Polish People's Republic. It was elected in the 1947 Polish parliamentary election, the first since World War II. The first Legislative Sejm was formed in the aftermath of World War I on the territories of the newly formed Second Polish Republic.

== History ==
On February 5, 1947, the Sejm elected Bolesław Bierut as President of the Republic of Poland. On July 22, 1952, the Sejm passed the Constitution of the Polish People's Republic. It made the communist-led Sejm "the highest organ of State authority". Despite this, the real source of power was the Polish United Workers' Party (PZPR) and its Central Committee, which was not regulated by the constitution but rather its own statute.

== Composition ==
The composition of the Legislative Sejm was as follows:

- Marshal: Władysław Kowalski
  - Democratic Bloc: 394 seats;
  - PSL: 28
  - Labor Party: 12
  - PSL "New Liberation": 7
  - others: 3
