= Politics of Białystok =

Coordinates: 53.116667°N 23.150°E

This is a sub-article to Białystok

Białystok, like other major cities in Poland, is a City with powiat rights (Polish: miasto na prawach powiatu). The Legislative power in the city is vested in the unicameral parliament, the Białystok City Council (Polish: Rada Miasta), which has 28 members. Council members are elected directly every four years, one of whom is the mayor, or President of Białystok (Polish: Prezydent). Like most legislative bodies, the Białystok City Council divides itself into committees which have the oversight of various functions of the city government. Bills passed by a simple majority are sent to the mayor, who may sign them into law. If the mayor vetoes a bill, the council has 30 days to override the veto by a two-thirds majority vote. The current President of Białystok, elected for his first term in 2006, is Tadeusz Truskolaski.

It is also the seat of government for the Podlaskie Voivodeship. The city is represented by several members of both houses of the Polish Parliament (Sejm and Senat) from the Białystok constituency. Białystok is represented by the Podlaskie and Warmian-Masurian constituency of the European Parliament.

== History ==
=== Second Polish Republic ===
The first resemblance of self-government in Białystok was the Temporary City Committee led by Józef Karol Puchalski, established at the end of 1918 and later approved by the Government Commissioner. The Temporary City Committee was selected according to nationality: 8 Jews, 6 Poles, 1 Russian and 1 German. Unfortunately, the sessions were dominated by Polish-Jewish conflict.

In independent Białystok, the Provisional City Committee faced significant challenges. It had to address the challenges of ensuring the safety of its residents and providing them with food and fuel. Besides the dire economic situation, the growing ethnic conflict also proved a significant obstacle. Józef Zeligman's article, published in Gołos Bielastok, was widely commented on in the city. This was a Russian-language newspaper aimed at the Jewish intelligentsia. Its publisher and editor-in-chief wrote that Białystok was threatened by the prospect of endless occupation, only with a change of occupiers: the Germans will leave, the legionnaires will come, the legionnaires will leave, the Bolsheviks will come, the Bolsheviks will leave, the allies will come". Puchalski's position clearly weakened when Napoleon Cydzik took over the position of Government Commissioner on March 1, 1919. His main task was to prepare the local government elections, which were to be held in September. From the very beginning of his term, Cydzik marginalized the role of the Provisional City Committee. Despite the fact that in joint photographs he always sat next to the chairman Józef Puchalski, he was politically weak. The distance was also compounded by Cydzik's strangeness and lack of connections with the residents. The then elites of Białystok's local government had known each other for decades. Some had even served on the city council during the Tsarist era. After the elections, although the main purpose of his mission had been fulfilled, Cydzik continued in his position. At the turn of 1919 and 1920, he frequently traveled to Warsaw, summoned there to report on the local situation. In Białystok, not a week passed without him commissarially regulating the city's functioning. He approved fines imposed on local merchants for violating trading hours regulations and punished property owners who failed to clear snow and ice from sidewalks. In 1920 he was removed from his position and moved to the Voivodeship Office.

Social and ethnical disputes flared up between the Poles and the Jews, among other things, over the language of the proceedings as many Jewish delegates didn't speak Polish fluently enough, hence they asked to be allowed to use Yiddish, at least for a while. Their Polish colleagues and the Government Commissioner were unyielding demanding that only Polish would be spoken in public in Poland. Moreover, the Jewish community leaders complained that contrary to earlier agreements - they were passed over when filling managerial positions in the city administration. On the top of it was the regulation of the Commissioner General of the Eastern Lands of May 10, 1919, on the annexation of 21 nearby villages and summer resorts to the city (the so-called Greater Białystok). The urban area increased from 2,700 ha to 4400 ha, and above all - which was the point - its national and religious structure changed. The inhabitants of the annexed settlements were almost exclusively Poles Christian, a thing Jewish community treated as a political maneuver aimed at reducing its electoral chances.

Ultimately, the Jewish community boycotted the first elections to the Białystok City Council held on September 7, 1919. Only 12% of the city's eligible residents took part in the vote. To obtain a mandate, the support of only a few dozen voters was enough. As a result, there was not a single representative of national minorities in the Białystok local government. The first president was Bolesław Szymański. By-elections were held on December 13, 1925. This time, all national and political groups entered the fight for 9 vacant seats in the City Council (in place of councilors lost their mandates during their term). Six mandates were won by candidates of Jewish nationality. The United Jewish List's election staff reached for the first time in the city's history for modern forms of agitation, so-called electric advertisements placed on buildings and cinema advertisements displayed before screenings in the Apollo cinema.

Despite the additions, the Council was still criticized for not representing the entire community. This became the reason for the dissolution of the Białystok city administration by the Minister of Internal Affairs and the ordering of new elections for December 11, 1927. These were the first elections in Białystok held without any formal restrictions and with the full participation of all political groups. 13 separate lists were submitted with the communist list being invalidated. The election result was as follows: 21 Jews, 19 Poles and 1 German. In the new Council, the Jewish groups concluded an agreement with the Polish Socialist Party to prevent the right wing from entering the Board. The president was the retired colonel Michał Ostrowski (commander of the Białystok garrison in 1925-1926), and the vice-president - the Zionist Wolf Hepner. Following the dissolving of the city council in mid-1927, elections were set to December 11 that year. The new city council was dominated by Union of the Polish Electoral Committee list led by Bolesław Szymański which received 8 seats.

Throughout the interwar period, the socialists also had a significant group of supporters in Białystok. Due to the working-class nature of the city, the people's parties had little influence. At the end of the 1930s, there were two main influential political camps: the ruling party and the democratic opposition. After 1936, the activity of left-wing parties increased, whose representatives won as many as 16 seats in the elections to the City Council just before the outbreak of the war. In 1928 as a results of political infighting Ostrowski lost his position to Wincenty Hermanowski. On August 1, 1932, the Voivode Marian Zyndram-Kościałkowski dissolved the City Council, because it was unable to maintain a balanced budget. The city was managed by the government commissioner Seweryn Nowakowski, who moved from Częstochowa. He also held the office of the mayor of Białystok after the subsequent local elections in 1934 and 1939. The largest modernization works in the city in the pre-war period are associated with his name. In the years 1919-1927, the orthodox Jewish party was in first place, only giving way in the subsequent elections to the Nonpartisan Bloc for Cooperation with the Government, which during the Sanation enjoyed the greatest support in Białystok in the elections of 1930. Among the Polish parties, the Polish Christian Democratic Party had the greatest influence until 1928, which then lost support to the Nonpartisan Bloc for Cooperation with the Government. Throughout the interwar period, the socialists also had a significant group of supporters in Białystok. Due to the working-class nature of the city, the people's parties had also some influence. In the May 1934 local elections, the BBWR-led bloc won with 23 deputies, followed by Zionists (12 deputies), Bunds-PPS block (7 deputies) and the National Democracy list (6 deputies). Altogether the new convocation of the city council included 30 Poles, 17 Jews and one German.

During the interbellum period, the National Party was also active in the city. For many years, the city and the district in the district structure formed one district government. The city was a municipal branch of the National Party. In June 1935, the party's Municipal Board was established, headed by Bronisław Horodko, who was succeeded in 1939 by Kazimierz Kornacki. Hipolit Kaliszewski was also a well-known national activist. In the city, among the high school youth, there was a National Commune Organization with about 250 members. According to the report of the Voivode of Białystok Voivodeship, Henryk Ostaszewski, of April 26, 1939, the National Party in Białystok had about 500 members.

In May 1939, at the 1938–39 Polish local elections 48 deputies were elected to the Białystok City Council under the following division: PPS and class trade unions - 6, Bund and class trade unions - 10, Jewish Democratic Bloc (Polish: Żydowski Demokratyczny Blok - 3, General Jewish Bloc (Polish: Ogólny Blok Żydowski) - 3, Christian National-Economic Electoral Committee - 21 and National Party, 5.

=== Polish People's Republic ===
The waves of demand for reforming the existing system, which occurred in Białystok in parallel to other cities in Poland could be seen in the growing posture of Solidanosc organization. Białystok's "Solidarity" tried to gain a foothold in the Municipal National Council (Polish: Miejska Rada Narodowa; MRN). During the 18th plenary session of the Municipal National Council, which took place on October 15, 1981. The session was attended by representatives of "Solidarity" in Białystok: Bernard Bujwicki, Edmund Lajdorf, Jerzy Zegarski and Stanisław Guzowicz. They took an active part in the discussion on the election of the president of Białystok. The introduction of martial law interrupted the process of democratization of city councils. The next elections to the Municipal National Council were held on June 30, 1988, based on the new provisions of the Act of June 16, 1988 amending the Act on the system of national councils and local government. The MRN has been entrusted with some of the competences and tasks of the Provincial National Council. The term of office of the MRN lasted two years. It was a period of significant political and social changes. On August 21, 1989, Jerzy Czaban, who established cooperation with the MRN, took over as president following a recommendation from Janusz Andrzejewski from Solidarity Citizens' Committee.

On December 13, 1989, a demonstration took place in front of Białystok City Hall co-organized by the Polish Socialist Party - Democratic Revolution, the Independent Student Association, and the Independent Student Association. Songs from the martial law era played from the loudspeakers. The prevailing opinion among the demonstrators was that as long as Wojciech Jaruzelski was president, things would be bad in the country. The demonstrators then marched to the headquarters of the Provincial Committee of the Polish United Workers' Party on Edward Próchniaka Street (now Władysław Liniarski Street) chanting the slogan, "Youth will settle accounts with the party". A birch cross was erected in front of the Provincial Committee building, and candles were lit around it. Candles in the shape of a cross were also lit on the building's steps, and a bonfire made of posters announcing martial law was lit. The authorities of the Provincial Committee of the Polish United Workers' Party pressured Jerzy Czaban to have the cross removed, but he firmly refused. He also discussed this with Bishop Edward Kisiel during the Christmas wafer meeting and assured him that his services would not remove the cross. The year 1990 began with another conflict, which was a consequence of unsuccessful talks between representatives of the Independent Students' Association and the city authorities regarding the transfer of the headquarters of the Provincial Committee of the Polish United Workers' Party to the Białystok Branch of the University of Warsaw. On January 4th, the university authorities decided to begin occupying the building, and a day later the Independent Students' Union (NZS) did the same. Two days later, students made posters and banners, a plaque with the university emblem was prepared, and leaflets were printed on a mimeograph machine.

On January 8, 1990, students occupied the headquarters of the Polish United Workers' Party Provincial Committee. President Jerzy Czaban sent his representatives to the talks. After a long discussion, however, nothing was agreed upon, and the talks were postponed until the following day. The students decided to spend the night in the occupied building, and ome of the committee's staff also remained in the occupied building. Tadeusz Trzaskowski, Secretary of the Provincial Committee of the Polish United Workers' Party asked Marek Łochowski, the provincial prosecutor, to enforce the law and issue an order to remove the occupiers. He also sent a similar letter to Voivode Marian Gała. Although the prosecutor acknowledged receipt of the notification, he did not issue any instructions, and the voivode did likewise. At the same time, the Solidarity Civic Committee asked the provincial prosecutor's office to provide protection to the students staying in the PZPR Provincial Committee building.

Ultimately, the occupation of the building of the Provincial Committee of the Polish United Workers' Party was a success, although the students had to show a lot of patience, as the authorities were reluctant to implement the earlier agreement. During discussions with the authorities of the Białystok Branch of University of Warsaw, Technical University in Białystok and the Białystok Voivode, President Czaban promoted the opinion that the building of the Voivodeship Committee of the Polish United Workers' Party was a good place for the seat of the City Hall, while the Voivodeship Office could occupy the building under construction on Ogrodowa Street. The Voivodeship Office could occupy the seat of the Voivodeship Office and the Court building and, in combination with the building of the Institute of Law (transformed into the Faculty of Law of the University of Warsaw on June 27, 1990, by order of the Rector of the University of Warsaw), create a campus together with the Medical Academy. The Voivode did not agree to relocate the Voivodeship Office to Ogrodowa Street. The talks reached an impasse. Jerzy Czaban was sent to hospital and also submitted his resignation to the voivode. However, it was not accepted. After his recovery, Jerzy Czaban continued to serve in his position.

=== Modern Poland ===
On May 27, 1990, the first democratic elections to local governments since the end of World War II were held. In Białystok, over 185,000 people were entitled to vote, and approximately 75,000 participated in the elections. people, which constituted 40.54% of those entitled to vote. The Solidarity Civic Electoral Committee won decisively, winning 42 out of 50 seats, the Social Democracy of the Republic of Poland won 4 seats, the Christian Democratic Labor Party and the Coalition Electoral Committee won one seat each, the Bema Street Community Committee won one seat, and the Democratic Party also won one mandate. The best electoral result was achieved by Waldemar Mierzejewski (3,297 votes), the second was Ireneusz Choroszucha (3,272 votes), and Ryszard Tur (2,369 votes) were recommended by OKW "Solidarność". The decisive victory of "Solidarity" could have resulted from the weakness of the other parties and the division of votes into many lists in each constituency, which, under the proportional electoral system, gave the strongest party that enjoyed the support of voters additional mandates.

On June 7, 1990, the first meeting of the new City Council in Białystok, elected on May 27, 1990, took place. It consisted of fifty councillors. Janusz Dolecki was elected as its chairman. City President Jerzy Czaban delivered an introductory speech, informing the audience about the financial problems the City Hall was struggling with. The councillors agreed that the mayoral elections would take place on June 18, 1990. Emanuel Trembaczowski submitted a resolution to transfer the building of the Provincial Committee of the Polish United Workers' Party at 3 Próchniaka Street (currently Liniarskiego Street) for the needs of the English language department of the Branch of the University of Warsaw in Białystok. On June 18, before the meeting, councillors participated in a solemn Holy Mass celebrated in the Białystok parish by priest Antoni Lićwinka. The city council was also holding a vote to choose the president of the city: 49 councillors participated in the vote and in the first round, Jerzy Czaban received 15 votes and Bronisław Niepsuj 10 votes. 24 councillors voted against both candidates. The candidates did not win an absolute majority of votes, so a second round of elections was ordered. This time, 13 councillors voted for Jerzy Czaban, Bronisław Niepsuj received the same number of votes. 23 councillors voted against both candidates and therefore did not elect the president. Therefore, Janusz Dolecki, the chairman of the City Council, scheduled new elections for June 25, 1989.

This function was to go to whoever received two thirds of the votes. The vote was secret and 49 councilors participated in it. The competitors included Bronisław Niepsuj - an electronics engineer from the Białystok Television Components Plant Biazet, an activist of the Independent Self-Governing Trade Union "Solidarity", interned during martial law, co-founder of a private company, as well as an activist of the Białystok Land Civic Committee. The elections on June 25, 1989, were held as previously agreed. The Białystok Regional Board of "Solidarity" recommended Andrzej Łupiński for this position, Jan Citka was nominated by the Society of Polish Urban Planners, Wojciech Hołownia was nominated by a group of councilors and Lech Rutkowski was nominated by the Catholic Intelligentsia Club. All candidates represented the Solidarity electoral alliance, but none of them had the recommendation of the Citizens' Committee.

The commission found that none of the candidates obtained an absolute majority: Jan Citko received the vote from 7 councillors, Wojciech Hołownia 13, Andrzej Łupiński 7 and Lech Rutkowski 18 votes. Łupiński gave his votes to Rutkowski. As a result, Hołownia and Rutkowski made it to the second round. In the second round Hołownia received 18 votes and Rutkowski 24 votes, so once again no candidate was able to obtain absolute majority, so a third round was held. This time Hołownia received 13 votes and Rutkowski 29 votes, which led the City Council to appoint him the president of Białystok. The newly elected authorities were preoccupied with the stabilizing the sprawling financial deficit, the introduction of rational management principles, the adaptation of the structures and basis for the functioning of the urban economy to the rules of the free market, making up for the backlog in the development of infrastructure and streamlining the work municipal services.

In the period of the upcoming 2006 mayoral election, Mayor Jerzy Kropiwnicki of Łódź tried to support President Ryszard Tur, who had been president of the Christian Local Government Movement since 2003 and chairman of the Movement's Supreme Council. They also attempted to negotiate with Law and Justice leaders about joint participation in the local elections. It is worth noting that in Białystok, Law and Justice opposed Ryszard Tur, who became president as a candidate of the Białystok Right-Wing Alliance, co-founded by, among others, the Civic Platform. The PiS leaders did not agree to put forward Ryszard Tur as their candidate for mayor of Białystok. Marek Kozłowski received the recommendation. Lacking a political base, Ryszard Tur did not seek re-election. He ran as the leader of the Christian Local Government Movement (ChRS), but the group failed to cross the 5% electoral threshold and did not enter the Białystok elections.

== Governance ==
The last municipal elections were held in 2024 and were won by Civic Platform, which holds a majority of the seats in the Białystok City Council. The current city mayor, Tadeusz Truskolaski, won the elections as the Civic Platform's candidate, however, he has no official connection with the party. Platform's major opponents, Law and Justice, have a minority of the seats in the City Council and were running the city administration before 2006.

The responsibilities of Białystok's president include drafting and implementing resolutions, enacting city bylaws, managing the city budget, employing city administrators, and preparing against floods and natural disasters. The president fulfills his duties with the help of the City Council, city managers and city inspectors.

In 2007 the city authorities established the Youth City Council, which is a self-governing body of adolescents living in Białystok and learning in secondary schools in the city. Youth Council is a non-political consultative body for local government bodies.

The city's official symbols include a coat of arms, a flag and a seal.

== Intergovernmental Organizations ==
Białystok is a member of several organizations:

- Union of Polish Metropolises (Polish: Unia Metropolii Polskich)
- Euroregion Niemen,
- Polish Green Lungs Foundation (headquarters)
- Eurocities.

== Honorary Citizens ==
The following is a list of honorary citizens of the city:

- Józef Piłsudski – 1921
- Marian Zyndram-Kościałkowski – 1934
- Alfons Karny – 1975
- Lech Wałęsa – 1990
- Ryszard Kaczorowski – 1990
- Sławoj Leszek Głódź – 1995
- John Paul II – 1996
- Stanisław Szymecki – 1998
- Henryk Gulbinowicz – 2000
- Jerzy Maksymiuk – 2000
- Zdzisław Peszkowski – 2005
- Wojciech Ziemba – 2006
- Calherine Stankiewicz von Ernst – 2006
- Louis-Christophe Zaleski-Zamenhof – 2007
- Marian Szamatowicz - 2024

== Podlaskie Voivodeship Governance ==
Białystok is the capital of Podlaskie Voivodeship, the Voivodeship Office is located on Mickiewicz Street.

== National and EU Representation ==
Several members of both houses of the Polish Parliament (Sejm and Senat) are elected from the Białystok constituency. Białystok is represented by the Podlaskie and Warmian-Masurian constituency of the European Parliament. The current MEPs are Krzysztof Lisek and Jacek Kurski.

== International relations ==
- Belarus has a Consulate General in Białystok.
- Romania has an Honorary Consulate in Białystok.

== Mayors ==
=== Russian partition ===
- Franciszek Malinowski (1871 - April 1890)
- Aleksy Prviednikov (1891 - ?)
- Ivan Reshtniev (1896-1900)
- Franciszek Malinowski (23 December 1904 - June 1906)
- Stanisław Wiśniewski (June 1906 - 1908)
- Vladimir Dyakov (December 1909 - 1915)

=== Second Polish Republic ===
- Józef Karol Puchalski (12 February 1919 - 7 September 1919)
- Bolesław Szymański (7 September 1919 - 26 January 1928)
- Michał Ostrowski (26 January 1928 - 29 October 1928)
- Wolf Hepner (29 October 1928 - 26 November 1928)
- Wincenty Hermanowski (26 November 1928 - 10 August 1932)
- Seweryn Nowakowski (August 1932 - September 1939)

=== Polish People's Republic ===
==== City presidents ====
- Ryszard Gołębiewski (3 August 1944 - 7 August 1944)
- Witold Wenclik (31 August 1944 - 1945)
- Andrzej Krzewniak (30 May 1945 - 31 October 1948)
- Władysław Tomaszewicz (24 September 1948 - 1949)

==== Chairman of the Presidium of the City National Council ====
- Jadwiga Zubrycka (1949-1953)
- Roman Woźniak (September 1953-September 1956)
- Bogdan Załuski (October 1956 - September 1958)
- Jerzy Krochmalski (1958-1965)
- Zygmunt Bezubik (1965-1972)
- Aleksander Czuż (1972-1973)

==== City presidents ====
- Aleksander Czuż (1973-1981)
- Tadeusz Naczas (15 October 1981 - June 1986)
- Zbigniew Zdrojewski (26 June 1986 - 1 June 1989)
- Jerzy Czaban (21 August 1989 - 25 June 1990)

==== First secretaries of the City Party Committee ====
- Marian Ossolinski ~ 1947
- Teodor Hajduczenia 01-08-1947 - 1-08-1948
- Czesław Grodzicki (Grodzki) 1948-1949
- Mieczysław Puszkiewicz ~1950
- Roman Przywitowski
- Mikołaj Wysocki 17 October 1954 - ~1955
- Kazimierz Ornat 10-06-1955 - 1957
- Zbigniew Białecki 13-11-1957 - 19-07-1963
- Józef Trusiewicz 07-09-1960 - 31-12-1971
- Romuald Żukowski 29-01-197 - 5-01-1981
- Mikołaj Kozak 05-01-1981 - 31-05-1981
- Józef Kowalczyk 31-05-1981 - 1/1990

=== Third Polish Republic (modern Poland) ===
- Lech Rutkowski (25 June 1990 - 19 June 1994)
- Andrzej Lussa (13 July 1994 - 13 April 1995)
- Krzysztof Jurgiel (1995-1998)
- Ryszard Tur (11 October 1998 - 5 December 2006)
- Tadeusz Truskolaski (5 December 2006 - incumbent)

== Bibliography ==
- Dobroński, Adam (2010). Historia Województwa Podlaskiego (in Polish). Oficyna Wydawnicza Kreator. ISBN 978-83-7344-057-9.
- Dobroński, Adam (2001). Białystok historia miasta (in Polish). Bialystok City Hall.
- Dobroński, Adam (2021). Historia Białegostoku (in Polish). Fundacja Sąsiedzi. ISBN 978-83-66912-02-1.
- Kietliński, Marek (2013). Białostockie władze administracyjne w latach 1919-2013 (in Polish). Wydawnictwo Prymat. ISBN 978-83-7657-156-0.
- Kietliński, Marek; Lechowski, Andrzej (2014). Prezydenci Białegostoku (in Polish). Publikator. ISBN 9788386462278.
- Oniszczuk, Jan; Wiśniewski, Tomasz (2011). Białystok między wojnami. Opowieść o życiu miasta 1918-1939 (in Polish). Księży Młyn Dom Wydawniczy. ISBN 9788377290156.
