= Białystok bus station =

Bus station in northeast Poland

Białystok bus station Dworzec autobusowy w Białymstoku
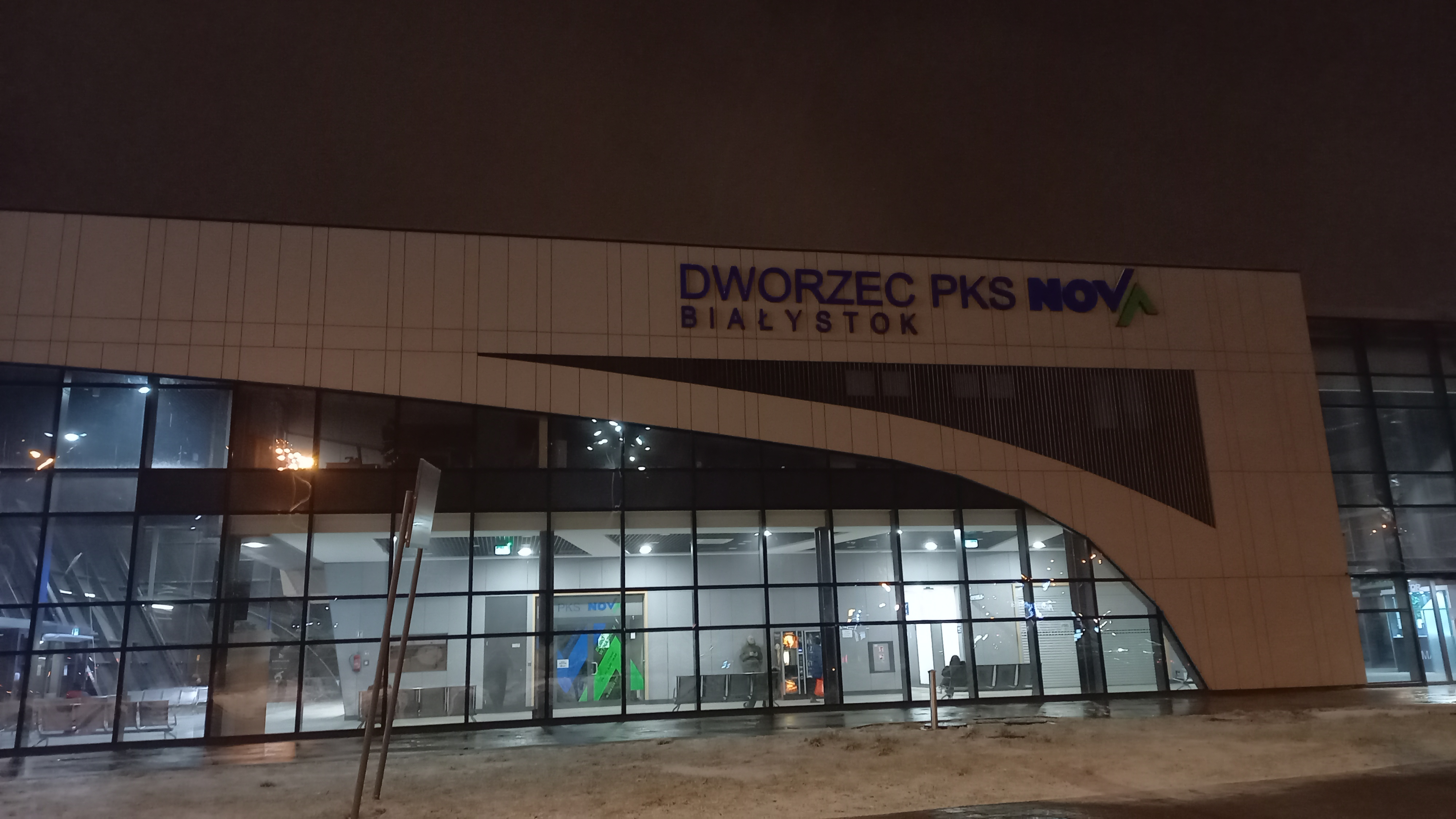
- The station building, January 2023

General information
- Location: Bohaterów Monte Cassino 8; 15-873 Białystok; Poland
- Coordinates: 53.132420°N 23.135908°E
- Owner: Podlaskie Voivodeship Marshal's Office
- Operator: PKS NOVA
- Platforms: 6

Construction
- Structure type: Ground building
- Parking: Yes
- Cycle facilities: yes
- Architect: Studio MTS

Other information
- Website: pksnova.pl

History
- Opened: 11 December 2017 (current form)
Location
- Location within Poland

Białystok bus station (Polish: Dworzec autobusowy w Białymstoku) known also as PKS NOVA Bus Station (Polish: Dworzec PKS NOVA) is a bus station in Białystok, capital of Podlaskie Voivodeship in northeast Poland. It has been located in Bohaterow Monte Cassino street since 1986.

== History ==
In February 1974, cornerstone was laid to a bus station in the station's current location. There were constant delays in construction and two work stoppages. In 1986 the new bus station was opened. A local newspaper, referring to the fact that the original plans could not be implemented yet, a long-awaited moment had come:

They are forgotten for a moment when on 27 July, the 42nd anniversary of the liberation of Białystok, at 4:20 p.m., the first bus departs in front of the new, built to a good European standard, the largest and most modern bus station in the country, from Bialystok to Supraśl.

In 2016, a tender was announced for the construction of a new bus station with the winner announced as Budner. On 1 March 2017 a notarial deed was signed between PKS Nova and the Budner Company regarding the transfer of 45% of the station area at Bohaterow Monte Cassino street. In exchange for the land received, Budner demolished the old and built a new station complex. Two small shopping malls were to be built on the site handed over to the contractor. On 29 May 2017 the foundation act was laid, officially starting the construction of the new facility, which was put into use on 11 December 2017.

== Operations ==
Various national and regional carriers have their operations in the bus station. The bus station is used as a connection point to the neighbouring countries Belarus and Lithuania. PKS Nova operates coaches to most major cities in Poland and to many smaller cities in Podlaskie Voivodeship.

=== Carriers ===
- Ecolines
- Flixbus
- Voyager
- PlusBus
- Zak Express

== See also ==
- Białystok railway station
