= Municipal Cemetery in Białystok =

- Cmentarz Miejski w Białymstoku
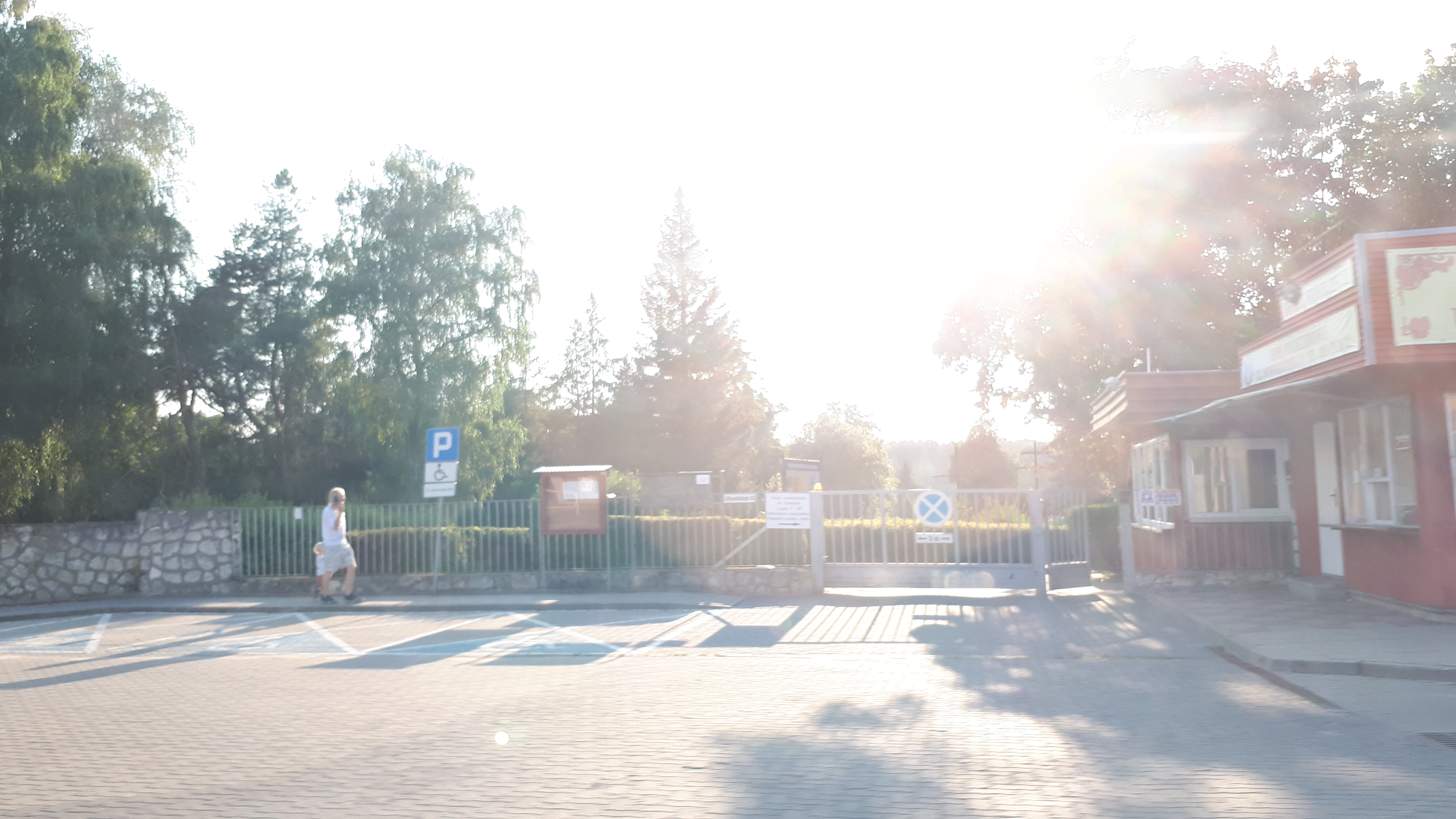
- Interactive map of Municipal Cemetery in Białystok

Details
- Established: 1939
- Location: 63 Wysockiego Street, Jaroszówka District, Białystok
- Country: Poland
- Coordinates: 53°9′35″N 23°10′54″E
- Type: Municipal cemetery
- Owned by: Białystok City Hall
- Size: 14.41 hectares (35.6 acres)
- No. of graves: 21,000

Municipal Cemetery in Białystok (Polish: Cmentarz Miejski w Białymstoku) is a municipal cemetery located in Jaroszówka District in the city of Białystok, north-east Poland.

== History ==
It was established in 1939 as a multi-religious military cemetery and later on it became an urban cemetery. Military section of historical importance (Polish and Soviet soldiers) currently occupy a small part of the necropolis, the remaining places are for the burials of civilians. Following the closure of the Bagnówka Cemetery, the cemetery was also used for the burial of the Jews of Białystok.

The cemetery includes family graves, single graves, brick graves, urn graves, children's graves and a columbarium. The common quarters of soldiers who died in the Soviet-Polish War and in the Invasion of Poland are located on the left side of the main avenue. In 1989, the society of Białystok founded a commemorative stone in front of the headquarters, on which there is a plaque with the inscription:

IN THESE GRAVES, NEXT TO 72 SOLDIERS FROM 1920, 100 UNKNOWN SOLDIERS FROM SEPTEMBER 1939 WHO FELT IN THE DEFENSE OF BIAŁYSTOK WERE BURIALED. ALSO BURIED HERE • Aviators: Capt. SEWERYN ŁAŹNIEWSKI AND 2nd Lt. EUGENIUSZ CHOJNACKI, WHO • ON September 3 FIGHTED A DEADLY BATTLE OVER THE TOWN WITH A GERMAN PILOT AND FELL IN THE WASILKÓW AREA. •• ON THE 50TH ANNIVERSARY OF SEPTEMBER 1939. • THE SOCIETY OF BIAŁYSTOK

In 2019 the remains of a Soviet soldier that was found in the area of Grodek were buried in the cemetery.
