= Culture in Białystok =

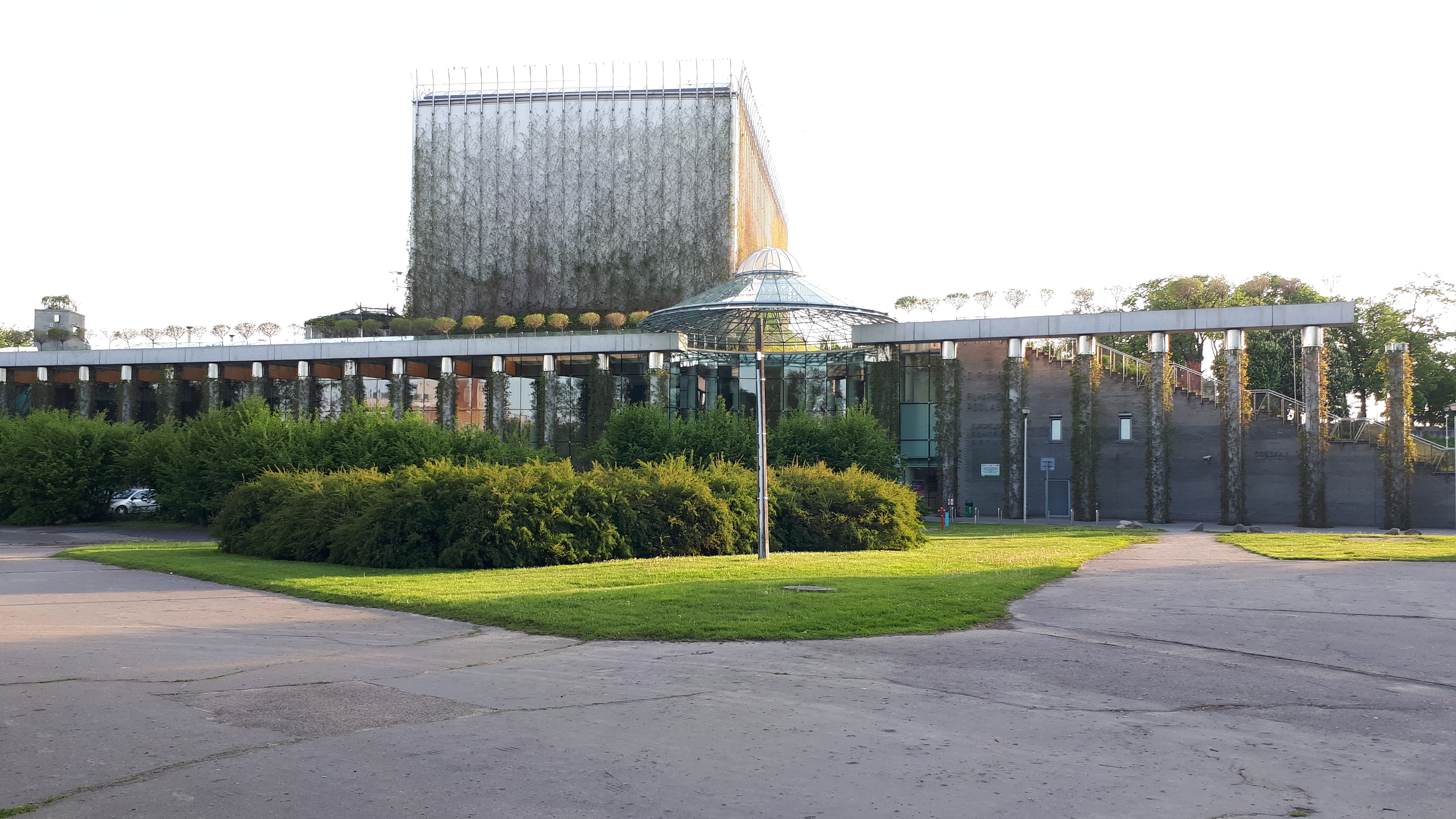
Opera and Philharmonic

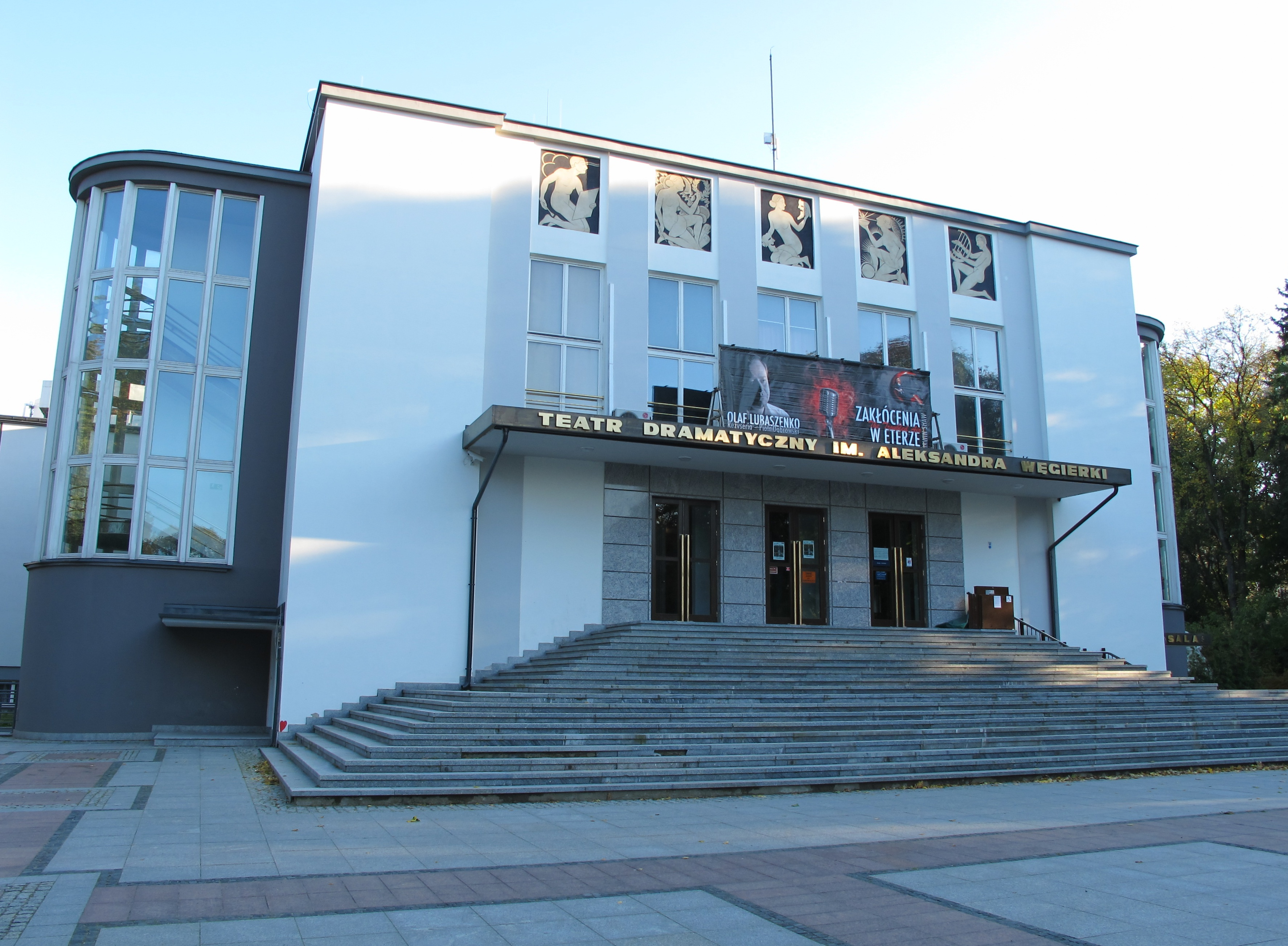
Wegierko Drama Theatre

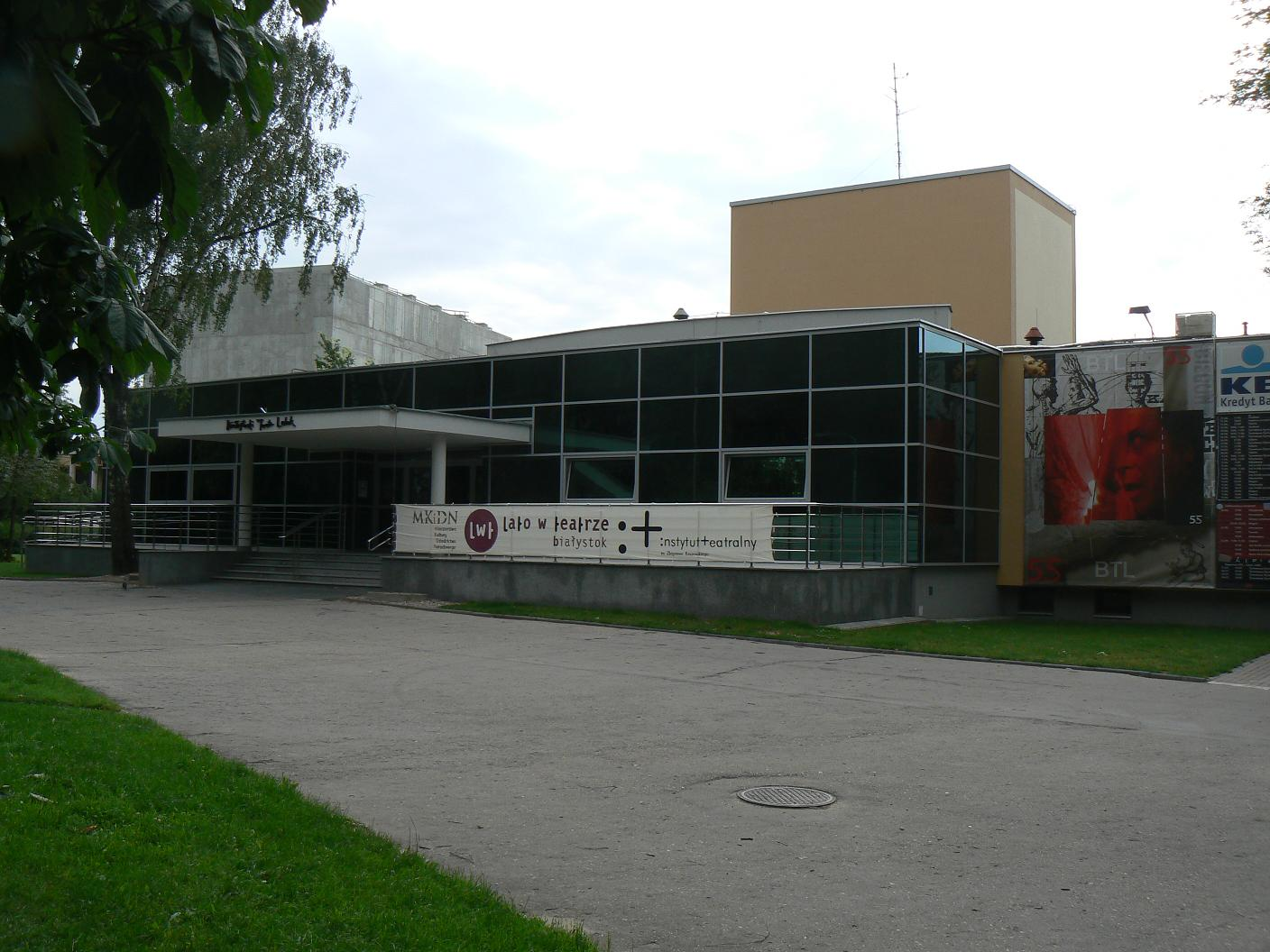
Puppet Theatre

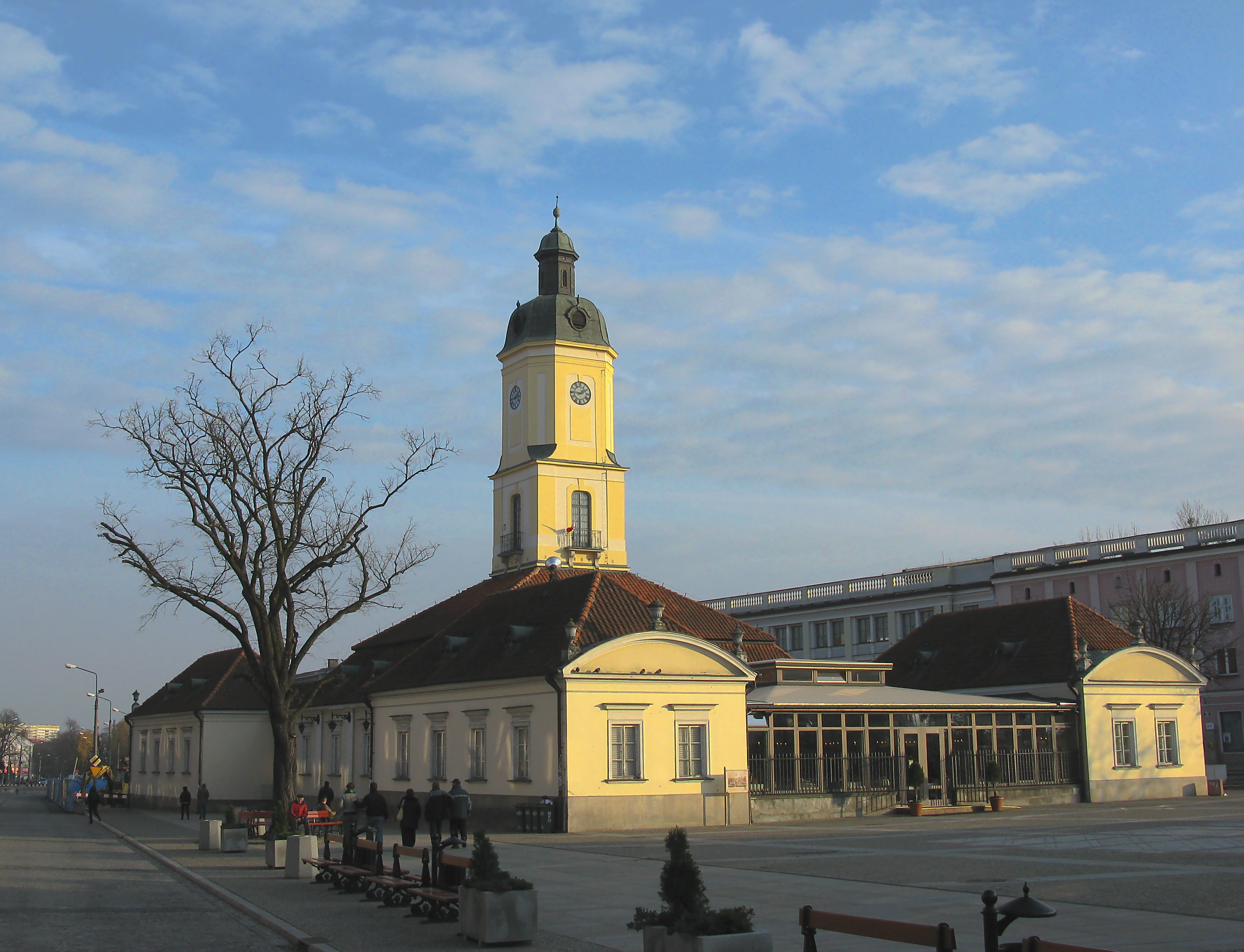
Podlaskie Museum in Białystok

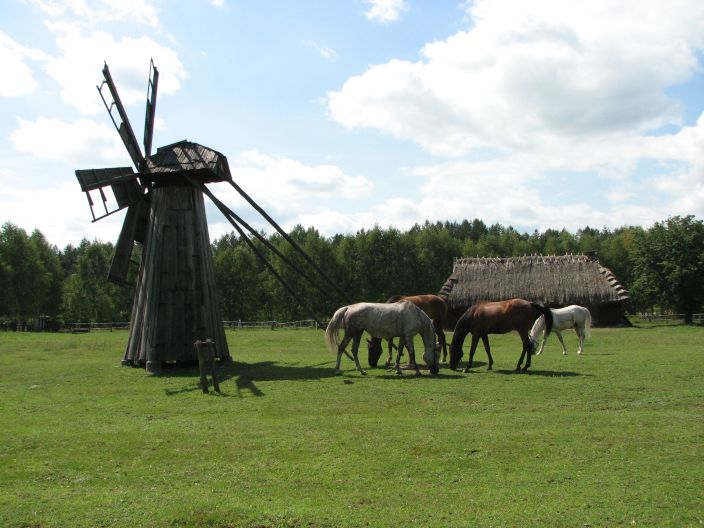
Podlaskie Museum of Folk Culture

This is a sub-article to Białystok

Białystok is one of the largest cultural centers in the Podlaskie Voivodeship. The attractions include performing arts groups, art museums, historical museums, walking tours of architectural / cultural aspects and a wide variety of parks and green spaces. Białystok in 2010 was on the short-list, but ultimately lost the competition, to become a finalist for European Capital of Culture in 2016.

== Arts ==
One of the first Polish painters in the city was Józef Zimmerman, who was entrusted with the artistic setting of the ceremony welcoming the Polish Army in February 1919. In the same year, on September 20, the first exhibition of Jewish art was organized in the Warnholca passage. In 1926 and 1928, on the initiative of the Circle of Jewish Writers and Journalists, Oskar Rozanecki, a painter and stage designer, manager of the Jewish theatre Gilarino, presented his works. It was not until the 1930s that the participation of Białystok artists in exhibitions increased. In October 1930, a collective exhibition of the local artistic community was held in the Representative Hall of the Voivodeship Office in the Branicki Palace. Many works were collected, including: works by Józef Zimmerman and artists of the younger generation: Czesław Sadowski, Oskar Rozanecki and Ichiel Tynowicki. In March 1932 an exhibition of paintings by the Białystok Art Group "Forma-Farba-Faktura" took place. In addition to Sadowski and Tynowicki, it included Michał Duniec, Nachum Edelman and Bencjon Rabinowicz. Other famous artists were Salomon Białoóorski, Helena Malarewicz, Józef Sławicki, Zygmunt Stankiewicz, Piotr Sawicki and Alfons Karny.

== Cinema ==
In interwar Białystok, there were five cinemas, the first two of which were established in 1919. The cinemas differed in standard, repertoire and ticket prices. The intelligentsia came to Apollo (22 Sienkiewicza street), Modern (20 Piłsudskiego street) and Gryf (2 Kilińskiego street) to watch more ambitious productions in exclusive conditions, while the Polonia (18 Piłsudskiego street) and Świat attracted a less demanding audience. Interwar Białystok was practically not recorded on film. No interwar feature films were made, and there was no film studio. However, in 1939, famous Jewish filmmakers, brothers Saul and Icchak Goskind, owners of the Warsaw film studio Kinor, made the only surviving film depicting life in the city at that time. It was 'Jewish Life in Białystok'. The specificity of Białystok was that relatively many films with Jewish themes were shown there. As a rule, all of them turned out to be box office hits, and were watched not only by the Jewish audience.

== Performing arts ==
The city has a number of performing arts facilities including:

- Białystok Puppet Theatre (Polish: Bialostocki Teatr Lalek), established in 1953, is one of the oldest Polish puppet theaters. The facility is located at Kalinowskiego 1 in Białystok. The repertoire includes performances for both children and puppet adaptations of world literature for adults. Because of the high artistic level of productions, the theater has been recognized as one of the best puppetry arts centers in Poland.
- Aleksandr Węgierki Drama Theatre in Białystok. Housed in a building designed by Jaroslaw Girina, built in the years 1933-1938.
- Podlaska Opera and Orchestra

== Museums ==
There are a number of museums in the city including:

- Historical Museum in Białystok (Polish: Muzeum Historyczne w Białymstoku) is part of the Podlaskie Museum. The facility has a rich collection of archival materials and iconography illustrating the history of Białystok and Podlasie, and a number of middle-class cultural relics, especially in the field of craft utility. There are also the Numismatic Cabinet of the collection of 16 000 coins, medals and securities. The museum is in possession of the only collections in the country memorabilia connected with the Tatar settlement on the Polish-Lithuanian-Belarusian region.
- Army Museum in Białystok (Polish: Muzeum Wojska w Białymstoku) was established in September 1968 as a branch of the Podlaskie Museum to house the research and collections of many people connected with military history of north-eastern Poland.
- The Ludwik Zamenhof Centre

Białystok, as the seat of the Voivodeship, is one of the largest cultural centers in the north-eastern Poland. It works in the Museum of the largest in the province of Podlaskie, with branches in Białystok (Historical Museum, the Museum of Sculpture Alfons Karny, Bialystok Village Museum). In Bialystok, there are also: Army Museum and the Museum of Natural History, University of Bialystok. There's also one of the best Polish contemporary art gallery - Gallery Arsenal. The second gallery is a municipal gallery to them. Sleńdzińskich, Poland has the largest collection of art and memorabilia archive Polish family of artists from Vilnius. In addition, there are 19 private art galleries here.

Białystok Cultural Center (Legionowa 5, 15-281 Białystok)

The Białystok Cultural Center was established in 1975. It organize over 200 events, festivals and local activities every year. One of the most popular event is Days of Bialystok which includes big cultural events like jazz concerts, dance and theater performances, and outdoor events. Another large festival is the Days of Modern Art festival - two weeks of movie, music, photographic, comic art, animation and theater events. From over 30 propositions about 25 are organizing by our center and the rest are mostly organized by Arsenal Gallery. Twice a month people interested in other culture/nations are participating in Globetrotter's World series - a meeting with many attractions: dance workshops, original food tasting, guest from all over the world including guest from different embassies. The biggest cultural event in autumn season is Autumn with Blues.

Śródmieście Culture House (Kilińskiego 13, 15-089 Białystok)

Śródmieście ("Downtown") Culture House was created by Resolution of the Białystok City Council dated. 4 February 1991. It a local cultural institution that operates as a center of art education and carries out tasks in the fields of education, cultural education, the dissemination of culture among children and adolescents and adults.

Youth Culture Club (15-201 Białystok Warszawska Street 79)

The Youth Culture Club in Bialystok is an extra-curricular education institution. It implements a program of teaching - educational as the statute, the work plan developed by the Teachers, the suggestions of the Parent Council and Youth Council, and according to the needs of the local community. It was established in 1983. The focal point of the work with youth is the interpretation of art and replenishment activities, education, polytechnic and sports, which enables the full development of personality of a young minds.

Białystok Puppet Theatre, Kalinowskiego 1, 15-875 Białystok

Sleńdzińskich Gallery (municipal institution presenting Vilnius heritage of Sleńdziński family), Waryńskiego 24A, 15-461 Białystok

The Arsenał Gallerył (municipal gallery of modern art) Mickiewicza Street 2 15-232 Białystok

The Army Museum, Kilińskiego 7, 15-089

== Libraries ==
In Białystok operates several libraries. The biggest of these is Podlaska Library (Polish: Książnica Podlaska) and the Białystok University Library. The elderly and the disabled free use of the Library Foundation for Education and Creativity, which offer the service "phone book" dedicated to those who are not able to reach out personally to hire. Other cultural institutions include the Białostocki Cultural Center, Orthodox Cultural Center, the Center for Esperanto. Ludwik Zamenhof, the House of Culture "Downtown", Voivodeship Center of Cultural Animation and Youth Culture

== Parks and green spaces ==
Approximately 32% of the city is occupied by parks, squares and forest preserves which creates a unique and healthy climate. The green spaces include:

- Branicki Palace (Polish: Pałac Branickich) is a historical edifice and 9.7 ha (24 acres) park in Białystok. It was developed on the site of an earlier building in the first half of the 18th century by Jan Klemens Branicki, a wealthy Polish–Lithuanian Commonwealth hetman, into a residence suitable for a man whose ambition was to be elected king of Poland. The palace complex with gardens, pavillons, sculptures, outbuildings and other structures and the city with churches, city hall and monastery, all built almost at the same time according to French models was the reason why the city was known in the 18th century as Versailles of Podlaskie (Polish: wersalem podlaskim).
- Planty is a 14.94 ha (36.9 acres) park created between 1930–1938, under the auspices of the then Voivode Kościałkowskiego Mariana Zyndrama in the areas adjacent to Branicki Palace. The modernist composition of the park was designed by Stanislav Gralla.

Approximately 32% of the city is occupied by green areas. Parks and squares and 1,779 ha of forest are located within the city which creates a unique and healthy climate. Within Bialystok, there are two nature reserves with a total area of 105 ha, that are part of the Knyszyn Forest. Such a location of nature reserves in the immediate vicinity of the city is unique. Because of these advantages in 1993 as the first city of Bialystok in Poland, was admitted to the International Network of Healthy Cities project conducted by the World Health Organization.

Within the town there are two nature reserves: "Las Zwierzyniecki" Nature Reserve and "Antoniuk" Nature Reserve.

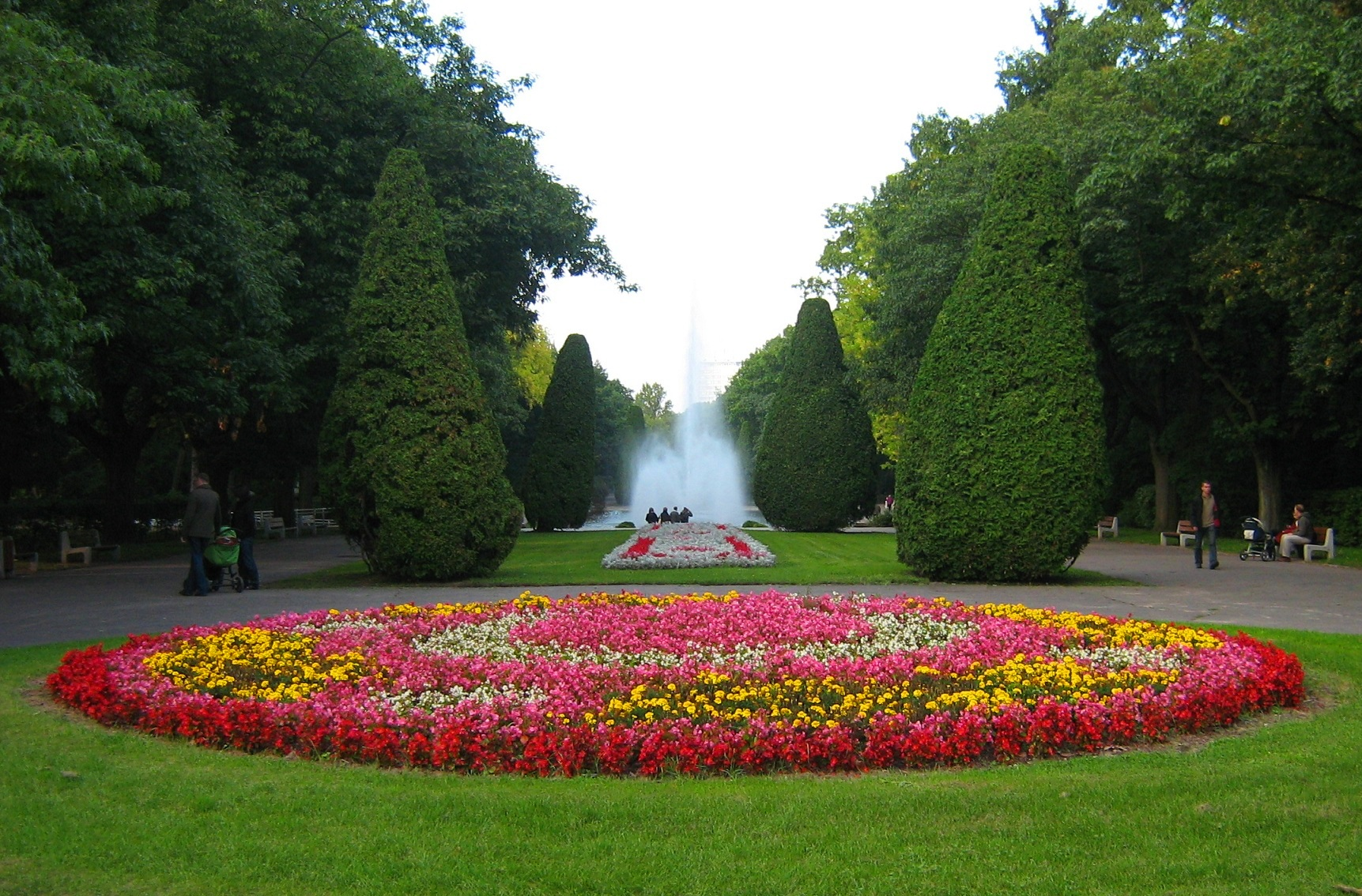
Planty park

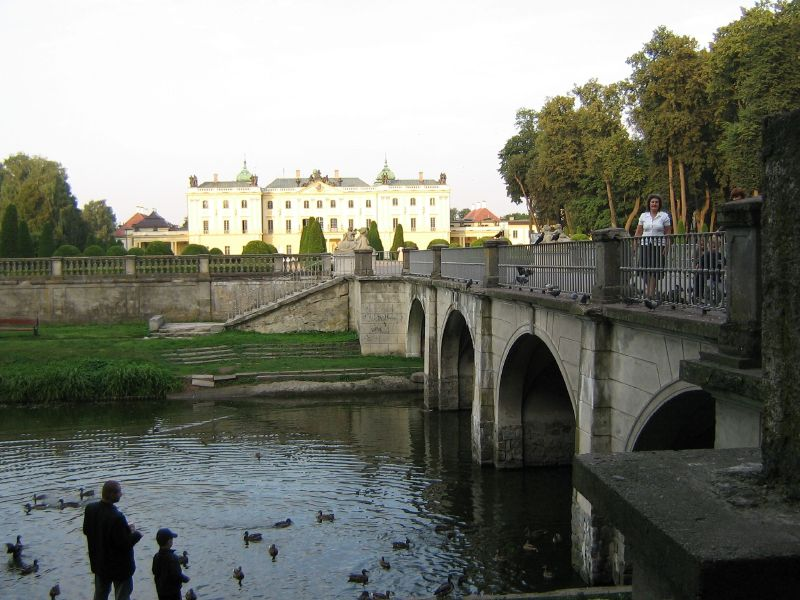
Branicki Palace and Gardens

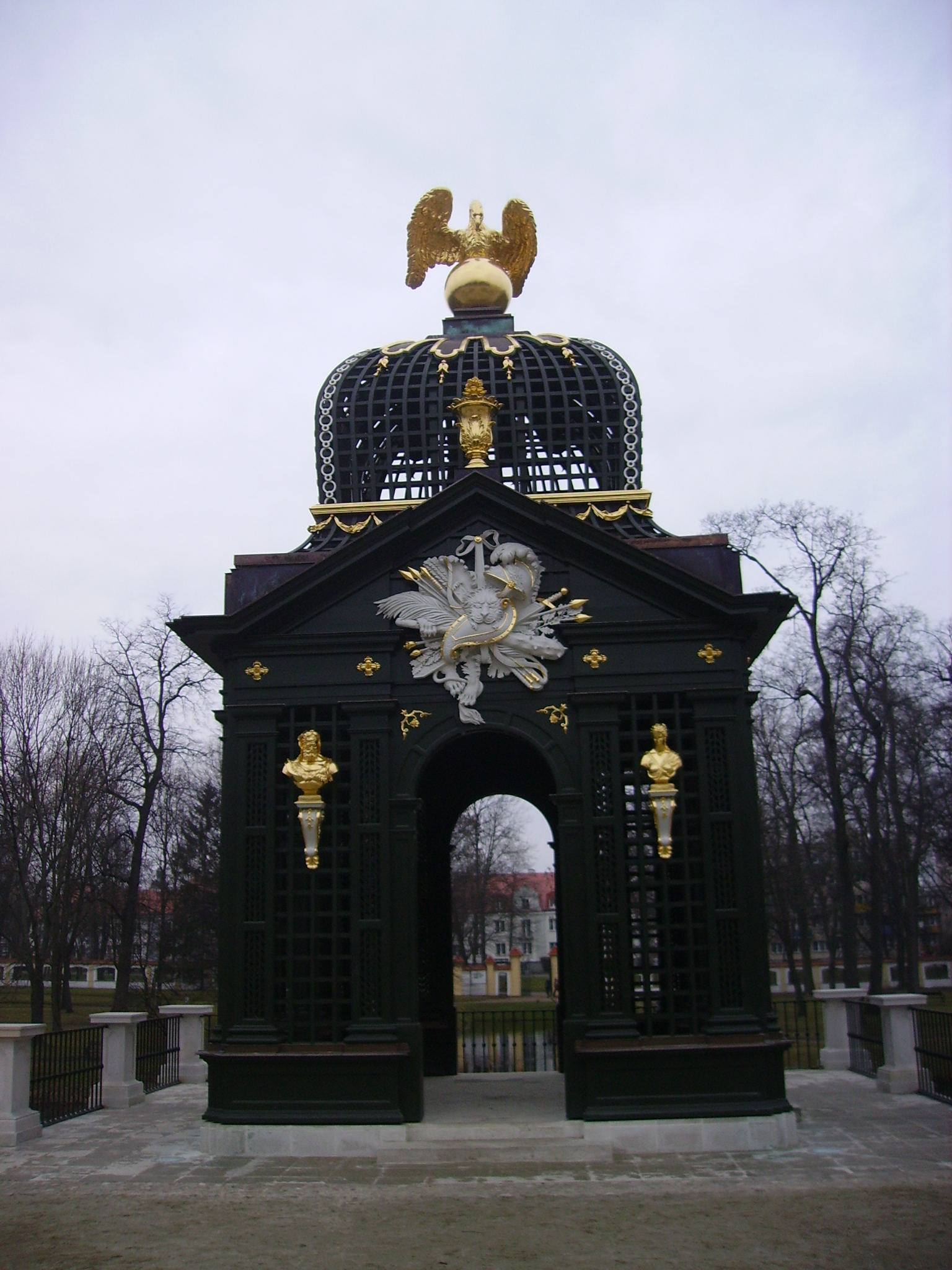
Garden of the Branicki Palace in Białystok

== Architecture ==
The various historically driven changes have had a significant influence on the architectural space of the city. Most other Polish cities have suffered similarly, but the processes in Białystok, have had a particularly intense course. Numerous historic works of architecture no longer exist, while many others have been rebuilt to their original configuration. Few of the city's historic buildings have been preserved - the sights are merely an echo of the old historical shape of Białystok.

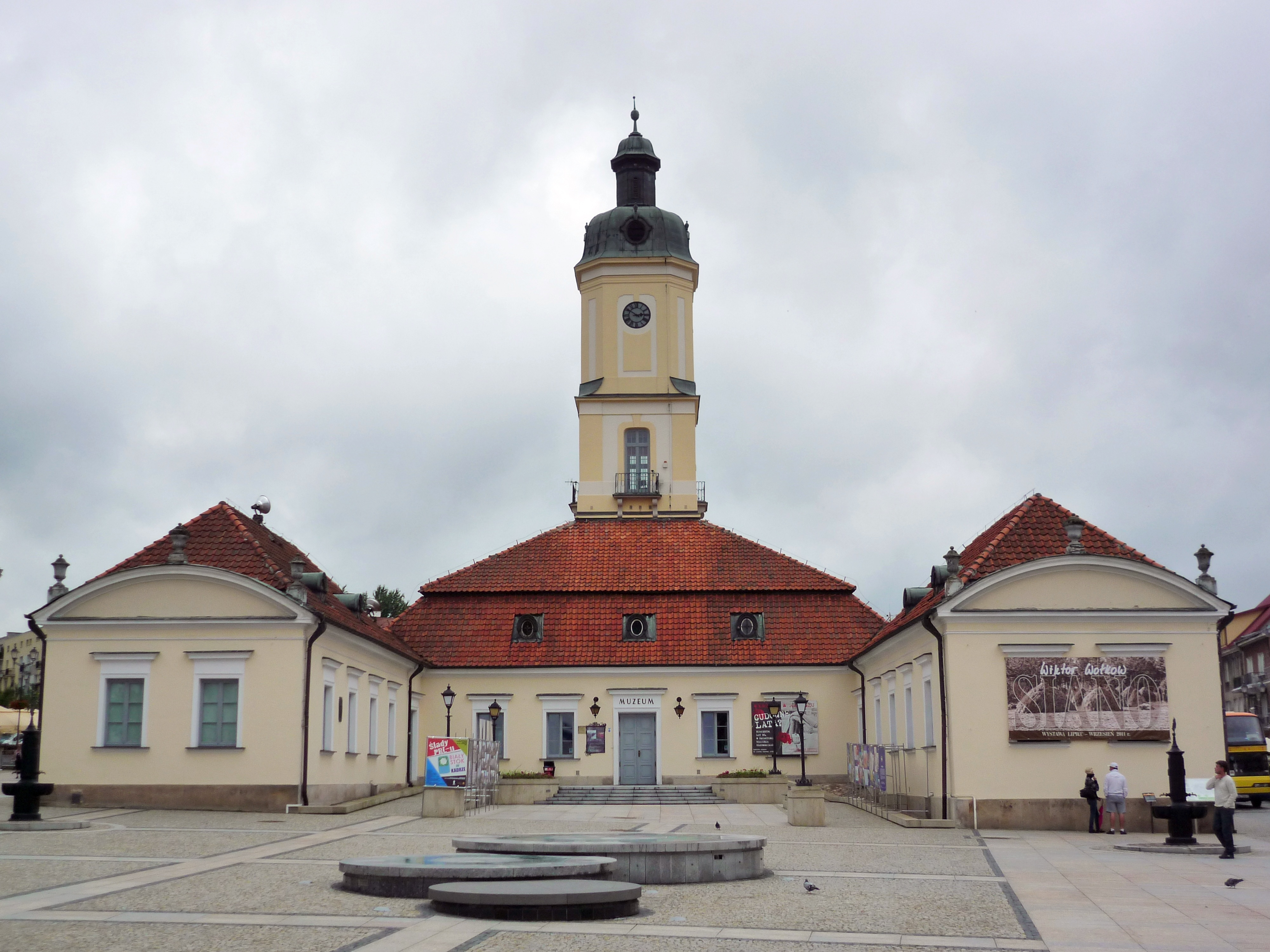
Bialystok City Hall

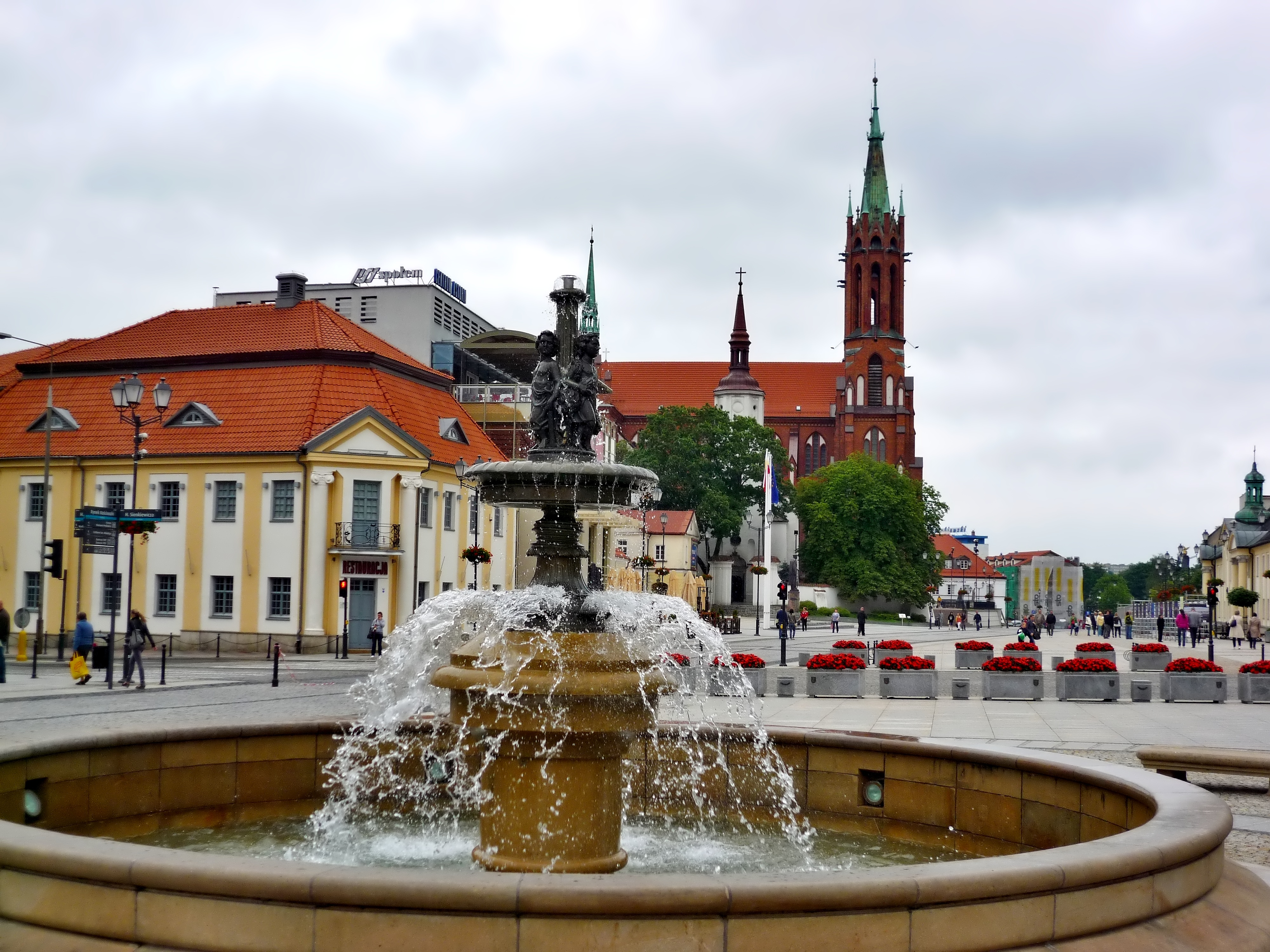
Fountain at the Market Square

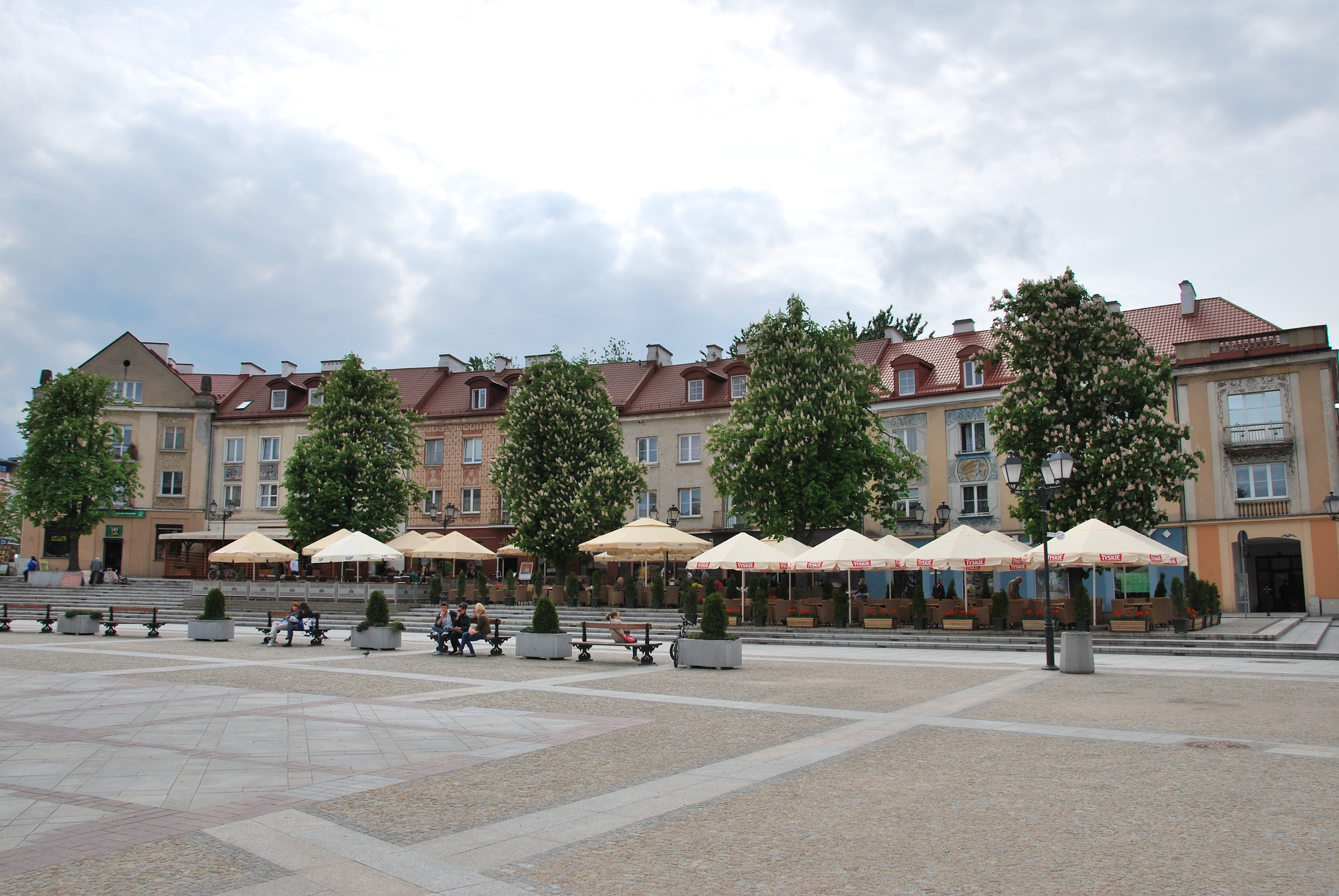
Old houses on Kościuszko Market Square in Białystok

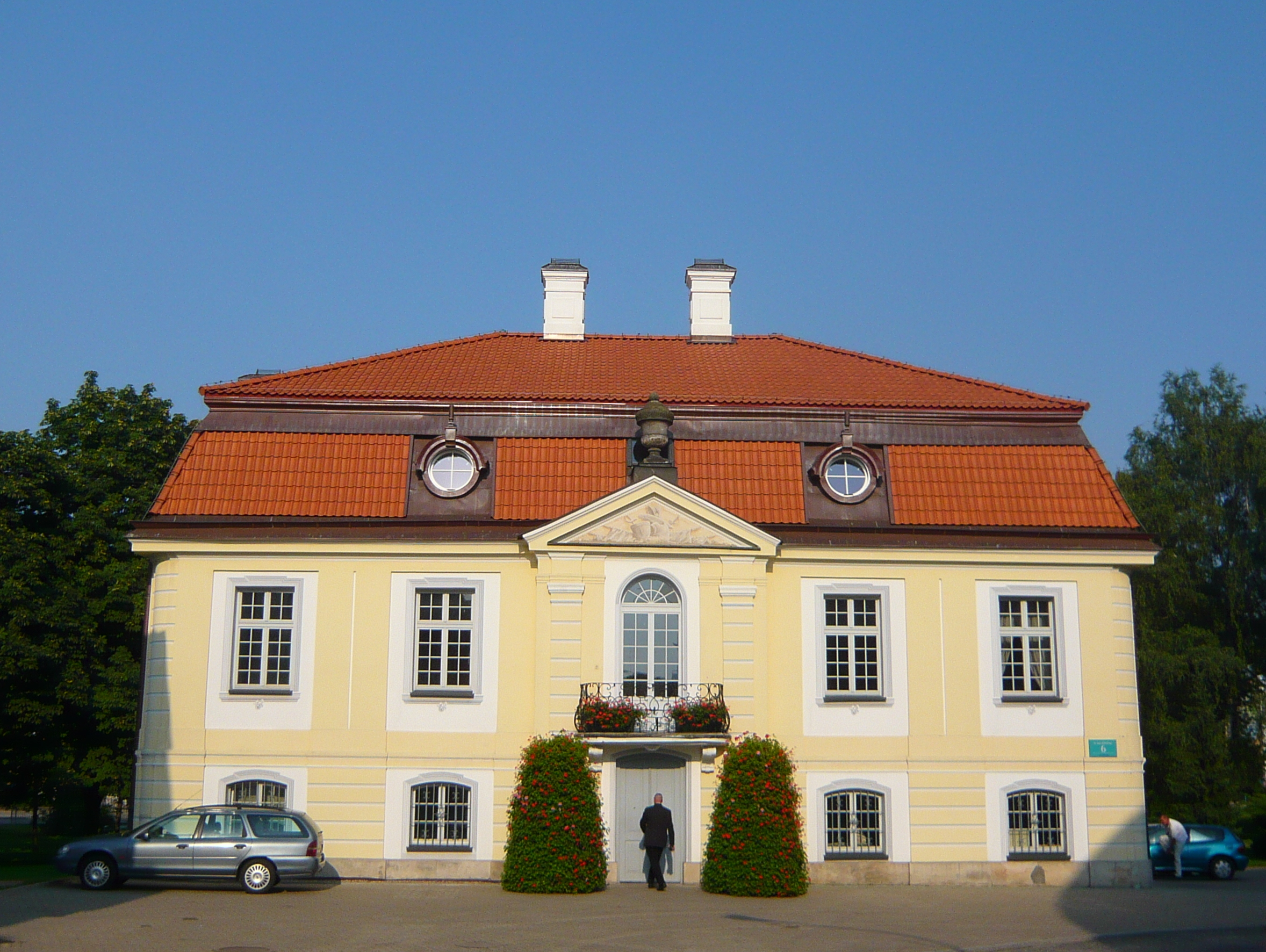
Guest palace Branicki in Bialystok

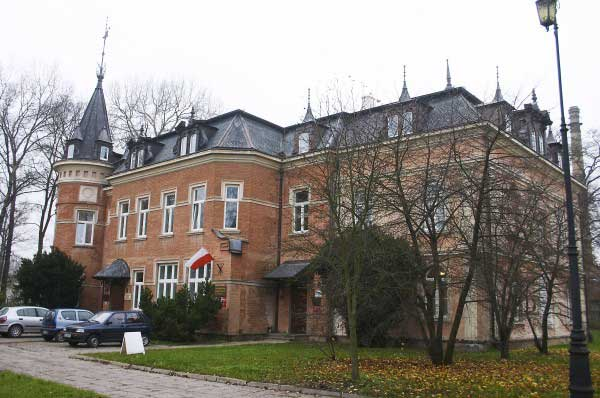
Hasbach Palace in Białystok

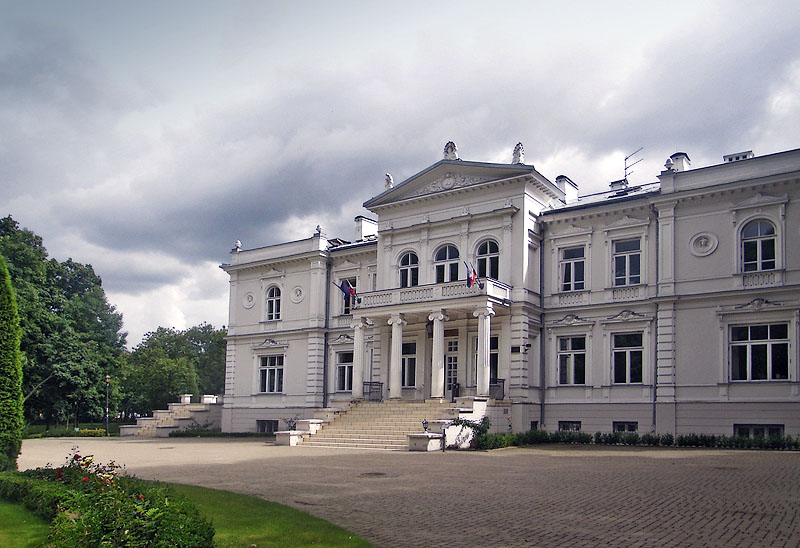
Lubomirski Palace in Bialystok

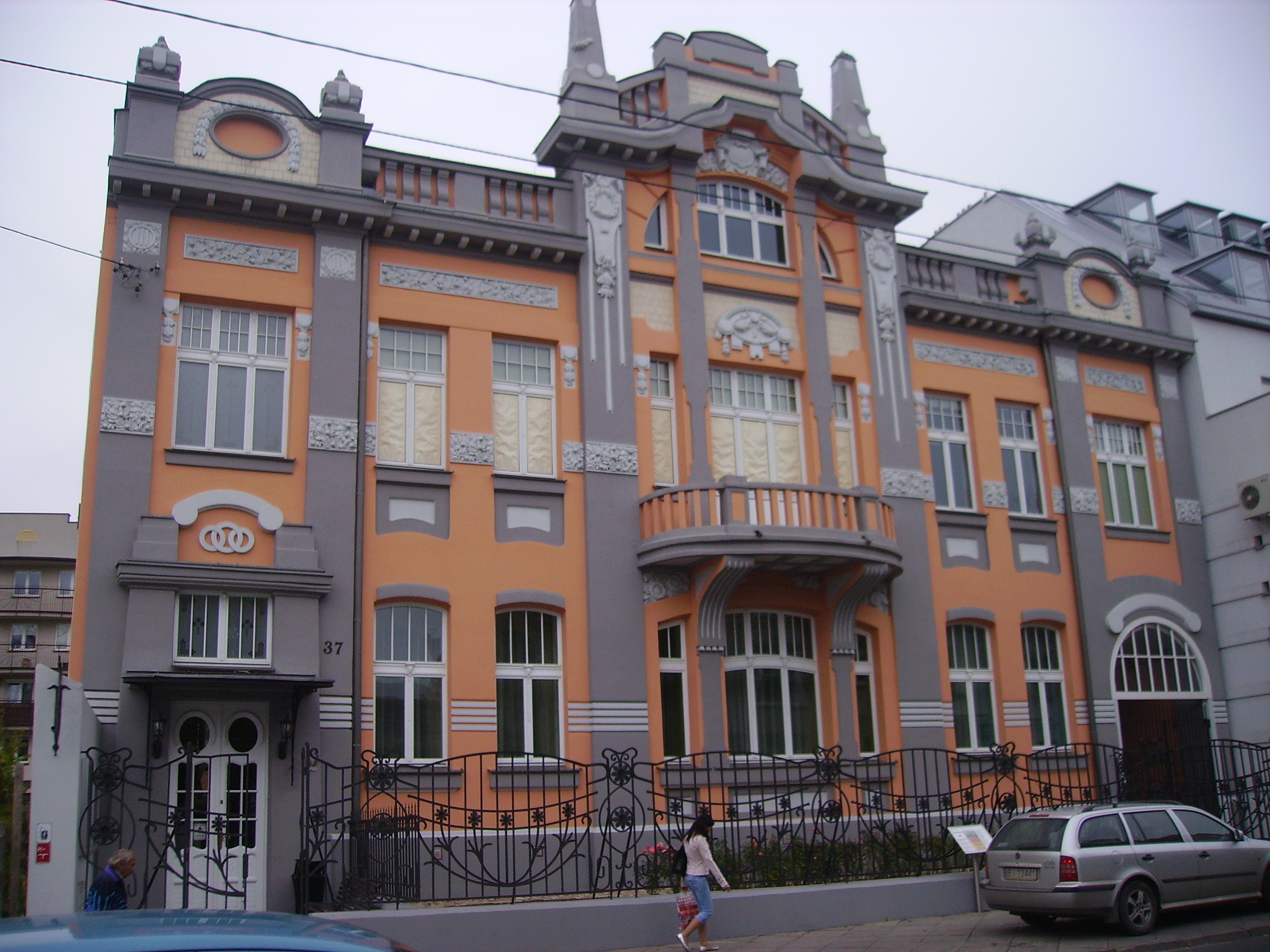
Citron's Palace in Białystok

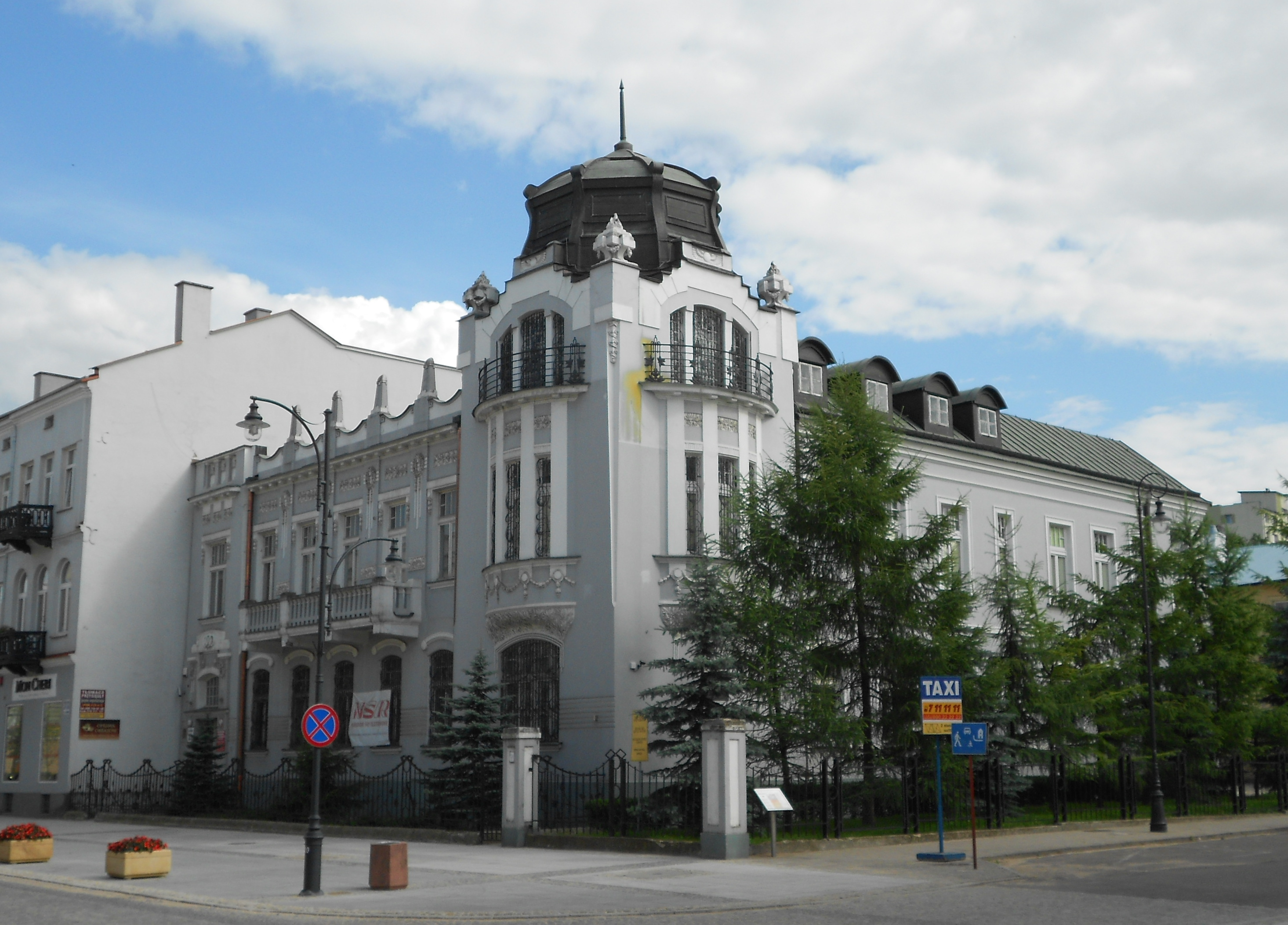
Nowik's Palace in Białystok

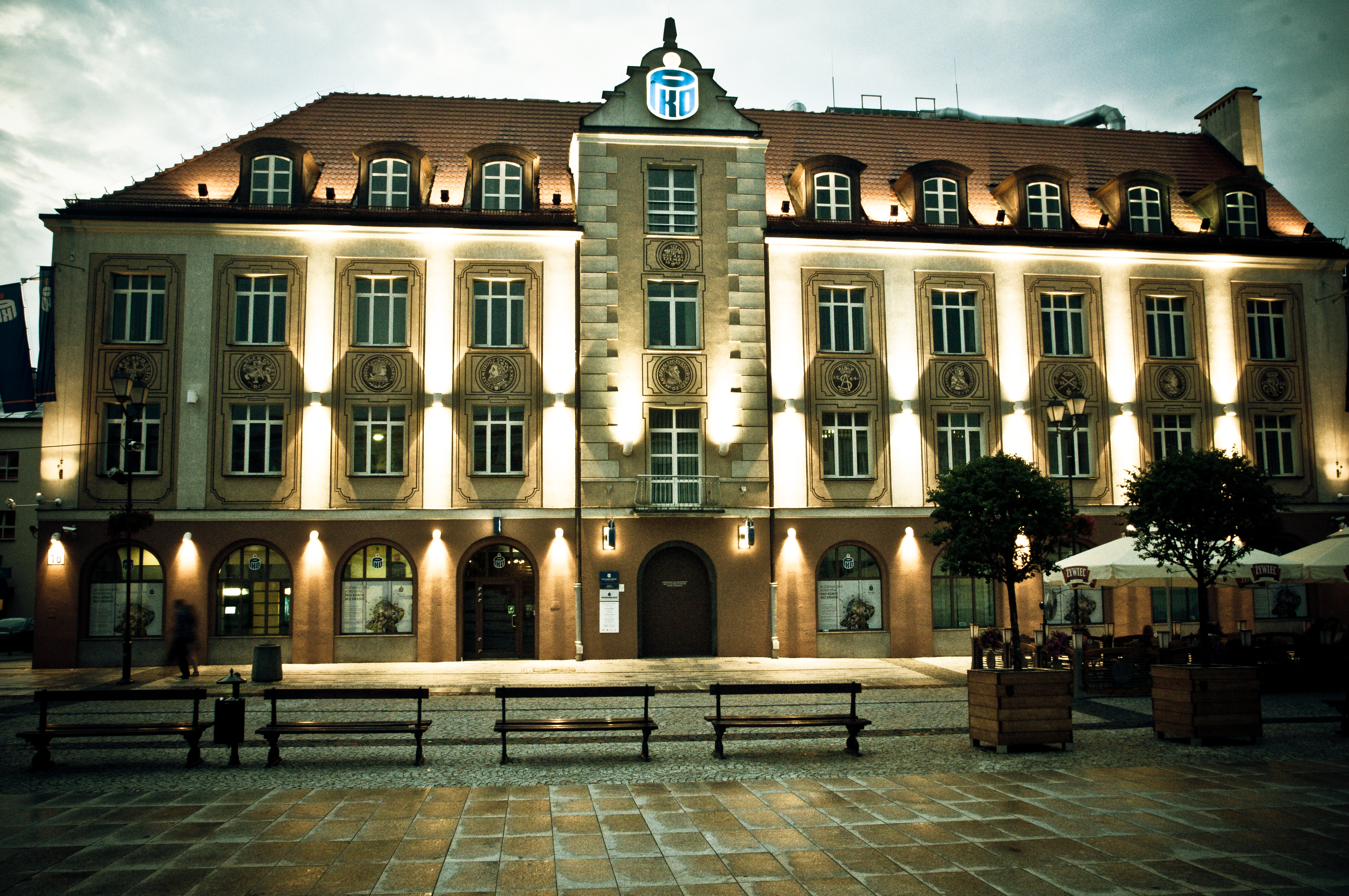
Kościuszko Square in Białystok

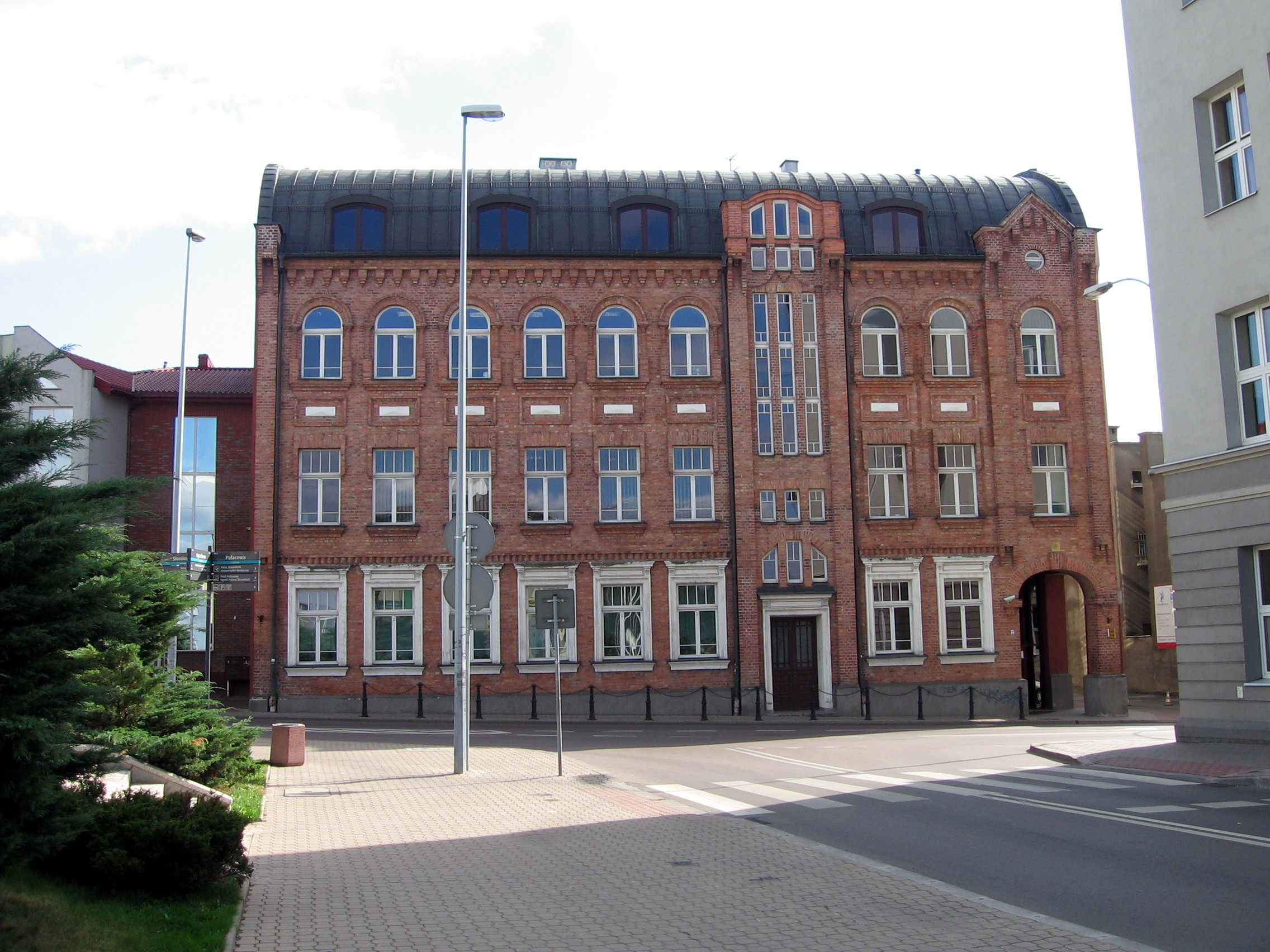
Pałacowa Street

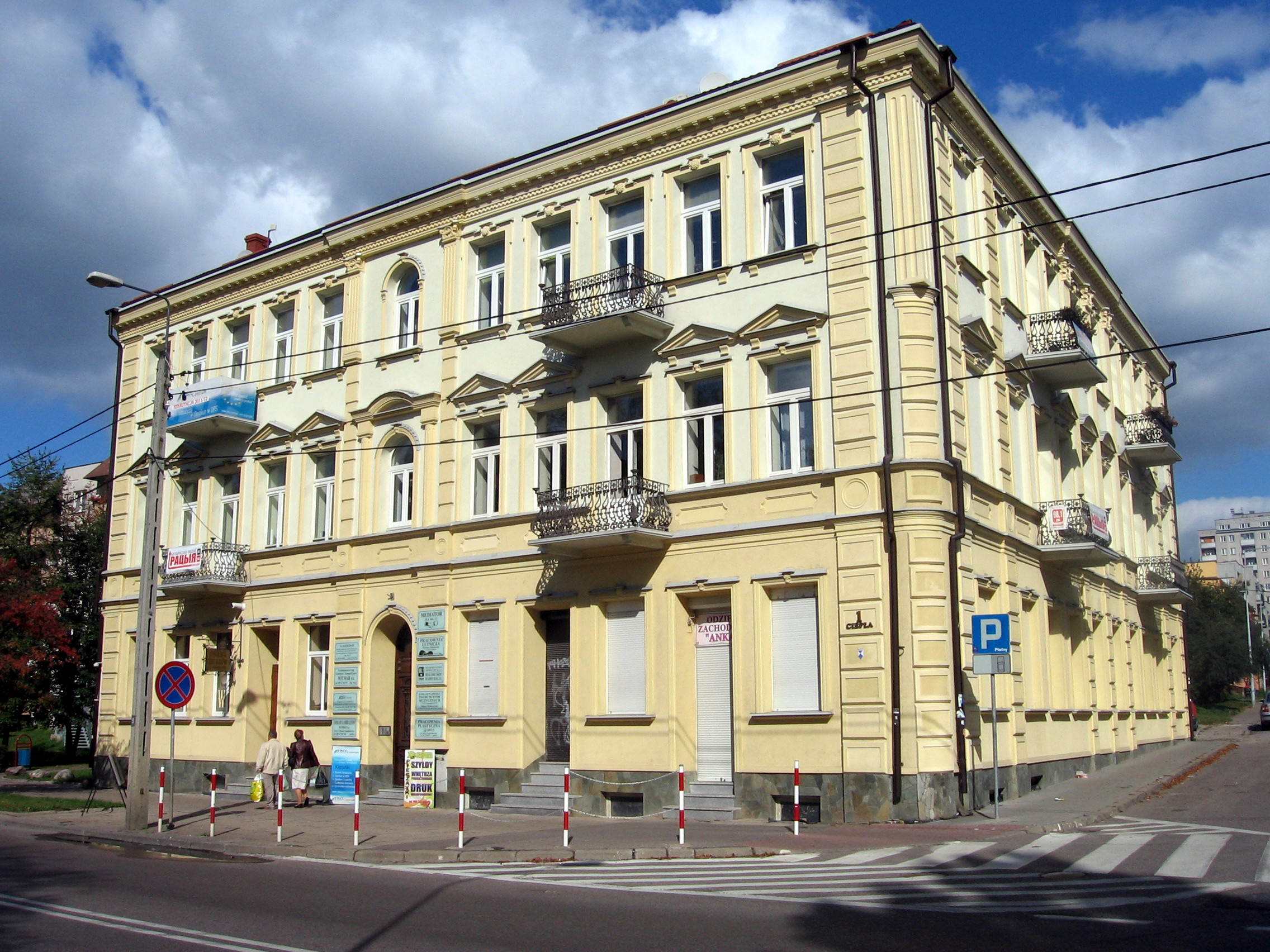
Ciepła Street

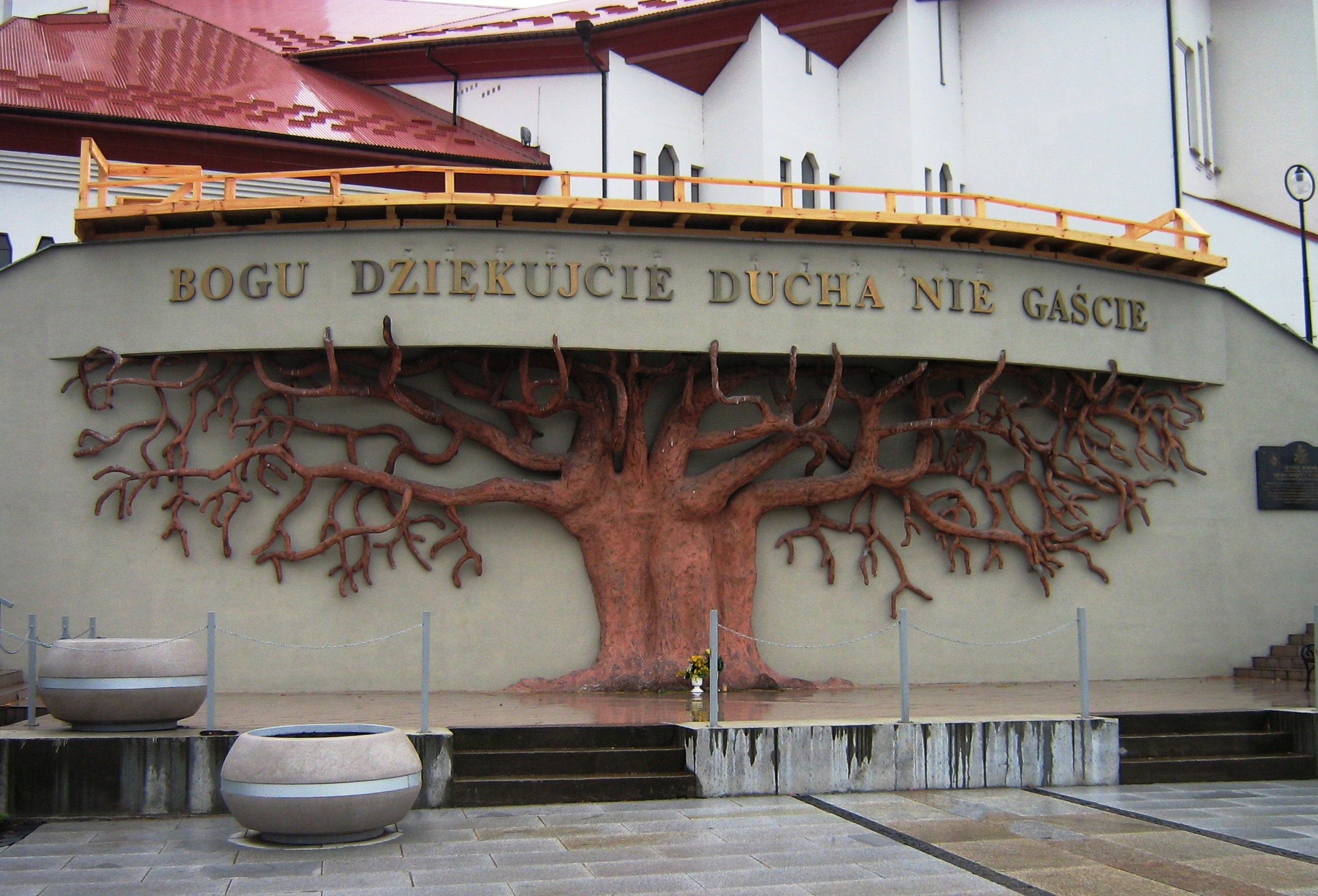
The papal altar at the Shrine of Divine Mercy

=== Monuments ===
- In memory of victims of the Polish-Bolshevik war
- "42nd Infantry Regiment" of Jan Henryk Dabrowski monument
- Armia Krajowa monument
- In memory of heroes from Białystok Land in World War II
- Jadwiga Dziekońska (soldier of Armia Krajowa) monument
- In memory of murdered Poles in Katyn
- Marshal Józef Piłsudski monument
- Jerzy Popiełuszko monument
- Polish Army in western Europe (during World War II) monument
- Solidarność monument
- In memory of Poles deported to Siberia
- In memory of murdered Jews in the Great Synagogue (WWII)
- In memory of victims of the Ghetto uprising in Białystok
- Defenders of Białystok monument (WWII)
- Ludwik Zamenhof monument
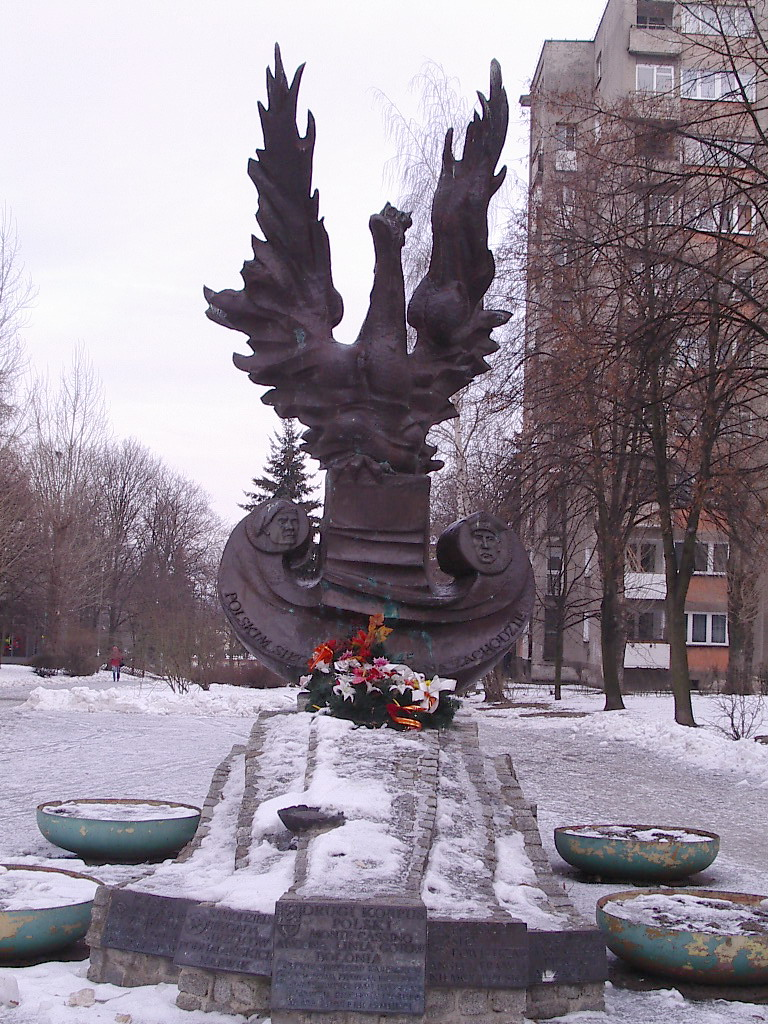
The monument of Polish Armed Forces in the West

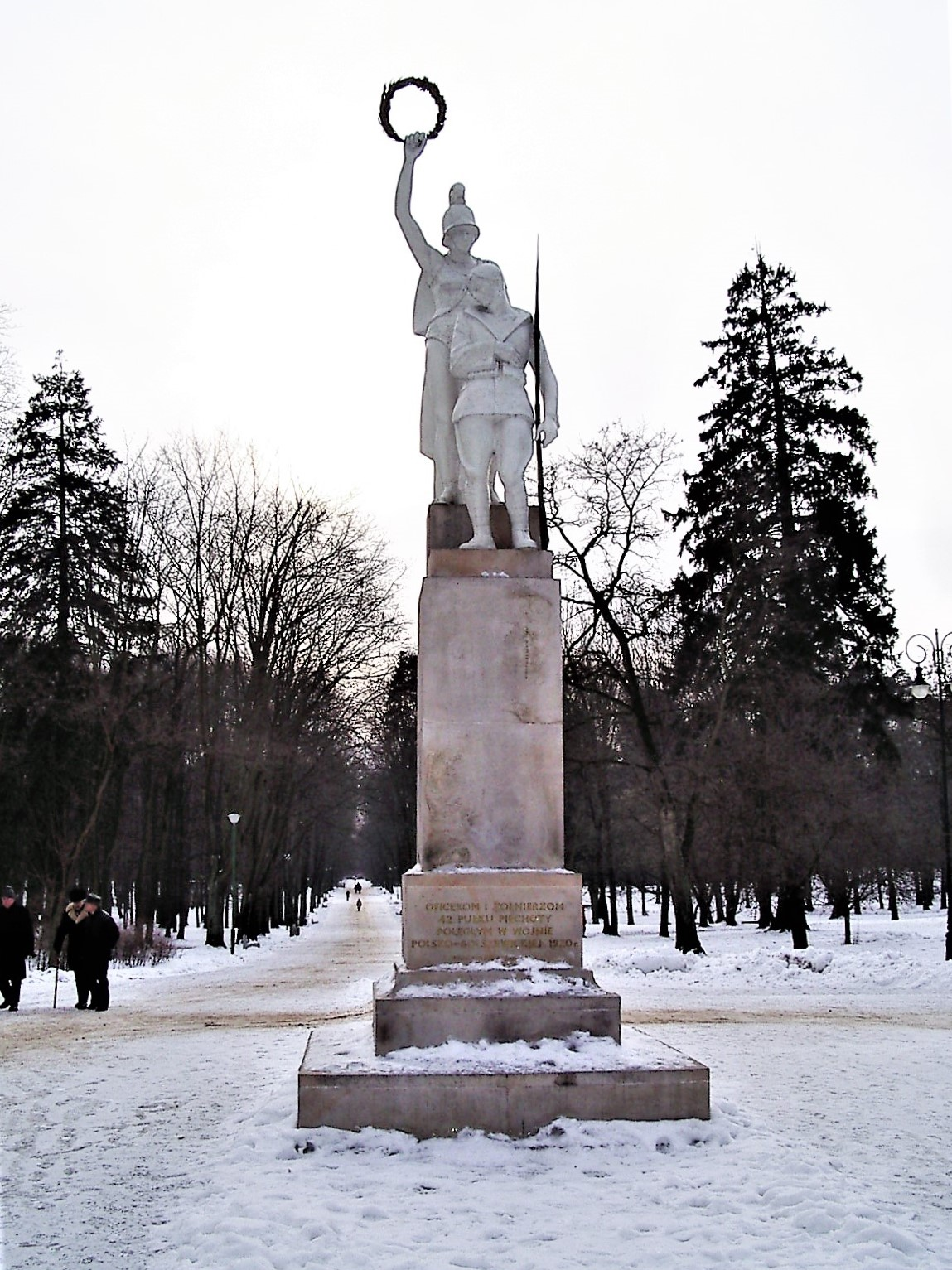
Memorial in honor of those killed in the Polish-Soviet War in 1920

== Events ==
A number of recurring cultural events happen every month in Białystok. The list includes, but is not limited to:

- Presentation of nativity scenes (January)
- Carnival - A Voivodeship Review of Dancing Companies (January)
- Szorty - the independent film festival (February)
- National Festival of Belarusian Song (February)
- Białystok Music Spring (March)
- Documentary Film Festival (March)
- Golden Shoes Ballroom Dancing Tournament (March - April)
- KOPYŚĆ Festival of Sailor Songs (March - April)
- Easter Festival (Easter)
- The International Festival of Orthodox Church Music (May)
- Days of Contemporary Art (May - June)
- Juvenalia Students Festival (May - June)
- Summer Divertimento, Sunday Chamber Music (May, September)
- Jazz Deptak, jazz concerts (May, September)
- Days of Białystok (June)
- Jarmark na Jana - the craft fair (June)
- Cathedral Organ Concerts (July - August)
- Białystok Orthodox Music Days (September)
- The Podlaskie Trade Fairs of folk sculpture, double warp textiles and folk smithing (September)
- European Cinema Forum (September)
- Białystok Summer Film Festival (August)
- Russian Culture Days (October)
- Papal Days (October)
- Białystok Folk Songs (September - October)
- Festival of Ukrainian Culture - the Podlasie Autumn (October)
- All Saints Day with the Blues (November)
- Autumn with the Blues festival (December)
- KRESY - Poetry reciting contest for Poles living abroad (December)
- Quo vadis - festival of Christian art
