= Miłosz Kotarbiński =

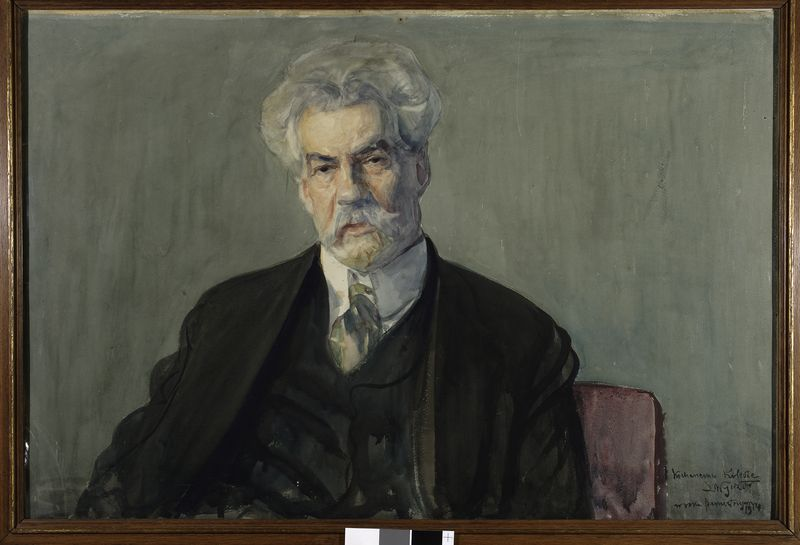
Portrait of Miłosz Kotarbiński by Leona Wyczółkowskiego (1914)

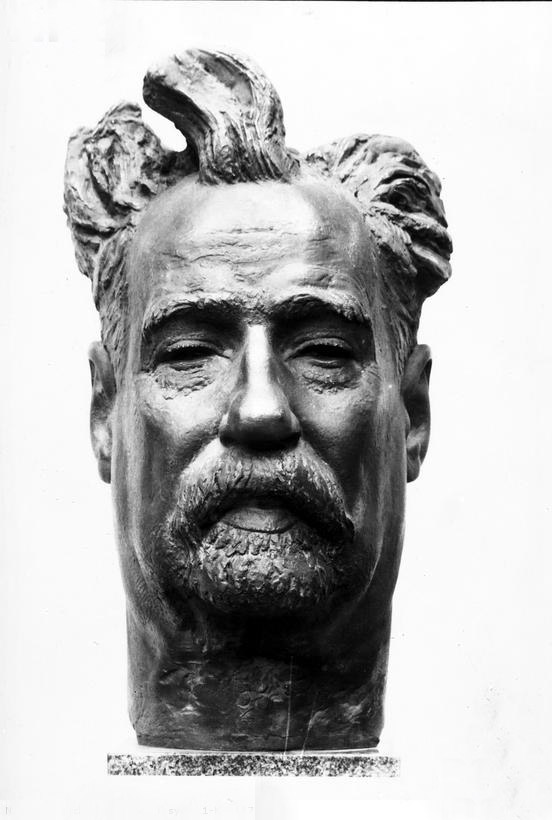
Miłosz Kotarbiński by Alfons Karny, 1935

Miłosz Kotarbiński (25 January 1854 – 27 October 1944) was a Polish painter, illustrator, literary critic, poet, singer and composer. Works by him are in galleries in Russia and Zagreb. His brother Józef was a literary critic and actor.

== Biography ==
He was born in Czemierniki. He studied in Warsaw under Wojciech Gerson and Aleksander Kamiński. From 1875, he studied at the Imperial Academy of Arts in St. Petersburg under the guidance of Mikhail Clodt von Jürgensburg and Pavel Chistyakov. During his studies, he was awarded a silver medal three times (1872, 1878, 1879) and a gold medal for the painting Prometheus Chained to the Rocks of the Caucasus, Washed by the Waves, in the Presence of Force and Power (1881). He graduated from the Academy in 1882 with the title of First-Class Artist for the painting The Sick Prince Pozharsky Receives Moscow Envoys. Afterward, he traveled to Rome.

After returning to Warsaw in 1883, he became a drawing and painting teacher in Warsaw schools, and later a professor at the Municipal School of Drawing in Warsaw. From 1887 to 1891, he served as the artistic director of pl:Tygodnik Illustrowany. In 1892, he founded a private painting school for women. In May 1909, he served on the jury for the competition to design the Chopin monument in Warsaw. In 1905, he became a professor at the School of Fine Arts in Warsaw, and subsequently served as the institution's director from 1924 to 1927.}} He worked for the Council for National Reconstruction and Rational Construction of the Provisional Council of State.

He lived in Chrzęsne for periods of time. He was the husband of Ewa Koskowska, a pianist and student of Aleksander Michałowski. He had four sons: Tadeusz, Mieczysław, Janusz, and Kazimierz.

== Works ==
Initially he painted history paintings and later landscapes as well as religious and fantasy scenes. His early works were strongly influenced by Jan Matejko. In 1929 he designed the one zloty coin.

== Selected works ==
- The sick Prince Pozharsky receives the Moscow envoys (Omsk Museum, Russia)
- Under the guardianship of angels
- Tritons
- Portrait of the artist's wife Ewa Koskowska Kotarbińska (1891), lost in 1939.

== Honours ==
- Order of Polonia Restituta:
  - Officer's Cross – 2 May 1923
  - Commander's Cross, "for merit in the field of art" – 10 November 1938
