= Podlachian Opera and Orchestra =

Opera house in Białystok, Poland

- Opera i Filharmonia Podlaska (Polish)
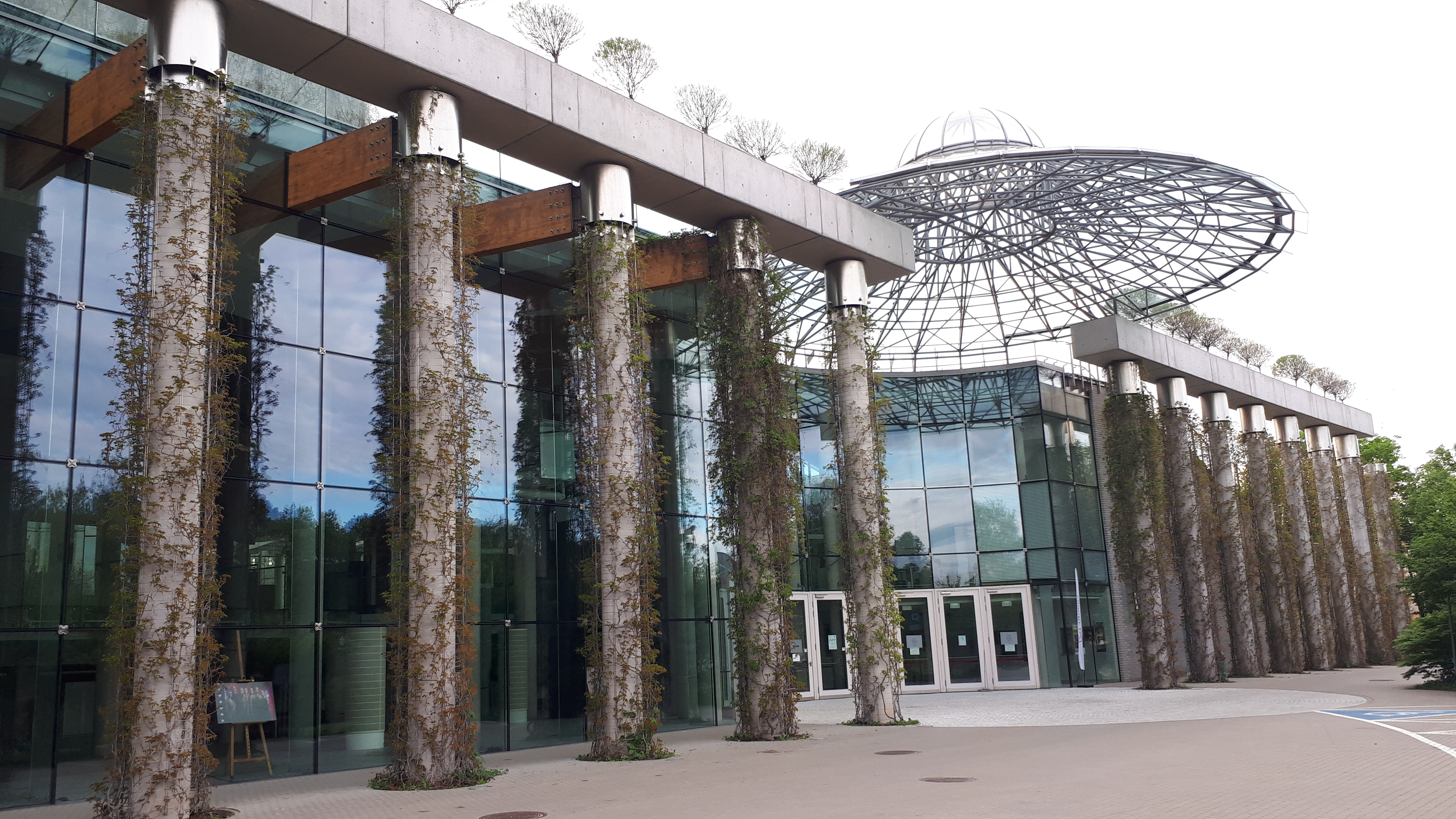
- Interactive map of Podlachian Opera and Orchestra
- Address: 1 Odeska Street; Białystok; Poland
- Coordinates: 53°07′47″N 23°08′59″E
- Type: Opera

Website
- www.oifp.eu

The Podlachian Opera and Orchestra (Polish: Opera i Filharmonia Podlaska) is a cultural institution in Białystok, capital of Podlaskie Voivodeship of Poland. It is the largest artistic institution in north-eastern Poland and the most modern cultural center in this part of Europe.

== History ==
The beginnings of the Symphony Orchestra of the Podlaskie Opera and Philharmonic date back to 1954, when the State Symphony Orchestra was established in Bialystok. The orchestra's musicians did not have their own headquarters at that time - rehearsals and concerts were held, among other places, at the Aleksandr Węgierki Drama Theatre or Guest Palace in Bialystok. After twenty years of artistic activity, the orchestra received the status of a philharmonic orchestra and moved to the concert hall at Podleśna Street.

The idea of creating a Music and Art Center in Bialystok was born in 2004. This initiative was supported by the authorities of the Podlaskie Voivodship and on July 9, 2004, a letter of intent was signed regarding the construction of the Podlaskie Opera and Philharmonic - the European Art Center in Bialystok. The signatories of the agreement were: Local Government of the Podlaskie Voivodship represented by the Marshal of the Podlaskie Voivodship Janusz Krzyżewski, the Voivode of Podlaskie Voivodeship Marek Strzaliński and the City of Białystok represented by Ryszard Tur - the Mayor of the City of Białystok. Under this agreement, on October 25, 2004, the Podlaskie Sejmik adopted a resolution initiating the construction of the Podlaskie Opera and Philharmonic - the European Art Center in Bialystok (resolution on the will to create a European Center for Music and Art - Podlaskie Opera).

At the beginning of 2005, an international urban and architectural competition was announced for the concept of building the Podlaskie Opera and Philharmonic - the European Art Center in Bialystok. 14 works were submitted to the competition, of which the winning project was selected on April 29, 2005. The winner of the competition was the studio of prof. Marek Budzyński from Warsaw, who has completed projects of the Supreme Court and the University of Warsaw Library.

On June 27, 2005, the Podlaskie Regional Assembly adopted a resolution on the creation of the Podlaskie Opera and Philharmonic - European Art Center in Bialystok, and prof. Marek Budzyński has signed a contract with the local government of the province. Podlaskie to develop design documentation for the Podlaskie Opera and Philharmonic.

In August 2005, due to the dynamic artistic and organizational development of the Institution and the opening of the new building planned for 2011, the Białystok Philharmonic changed its name to the Podlaskie Opera and Philharmonic. On September 9, 2005, during the ceremonial inauguration of the 2005/2006 artistic season, Minister of Culture Waldemar Dąbrowski and Marshal of the Podlaskie Province Janusz Kazimierz Krzyżewski signed an agreement on the creation of a national cultural institution - the Podlaskie Opera and Philharmonic - the European Center for Art in Bialystok.

=== Construction of a new building ===
Finally, on December 30, 2005, building permits were issued for the building of the Podlaskie Opera and Philharmonic - European Art Center in Bialystok. Due to limited financial resources, a decision was made to implement the investment in stages. On February 13, 2006, a restricted tender was announced to select a contractor for the first stage of construction, "shell open". On April 22, 2006, the foundation stone was laid for the construction of the Podlaskie Opera and Philharmonic - European Art Center in Bialystok. The implementation of the first stage was completed in December 2007. The following year, on October 14, an open tender was announced for the contractor of the second stage of Opera construction. As a result of the tender, three contractors were selected (separately for each task). Conclusion of contracts with selected contractors took place on April 7, 2009.

On June 29, 2009, an agreement was signed between the Podlaskie Voivodship and the Minister of Culture and National Heritage for co-financing the Project "Construction of the Podlaskie Opera and Philharmonic - European Art Center in Bialystok". Podlaskie Voivodeship received funding from the Operational Program Infrastructure and Environment, Priority XI Culture and Cultural Heritage, measure 11.2 Development and improvement of the condition of cultural infrastructure of supra-regional importance.

As part of the implementation of the second stage of construction, inter alia, the installation of decorative elements designed by Prof. Marek Budzyński.
