= Lidia Zamkow =

Polish theatre actress and director

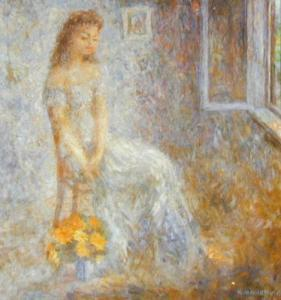
- Portrait of Lidia Zamków by Jerzy Makarewicz. (1942)
- Born: 15 July 1918; Rostov-on-Don, Russian SFSR
- Died: 19 June 1982 (aged 63); Warsaw, Polish People's Republic
- Education: Leszek Herdegen
- Occupations: Theatre actress Director

Lidia Zamkow (1918–1982) was a Polish theatre actress and director.

== Biography ==
Lidia Zamkow was born on 19 June or 15 July (sources vary), 1918 in Rostov-on-Don. Until 1939 she was studying at the National Institute of Theatre Arts in Warsaw, and after World War II at the State Academy of Drama in Łódź (now Aleksander Zelwerowicz State Theatre Academy).

In 1944 she made her own actress' debut in the role of Isia in the Stanisław Wyspiański's Wedding on Polish Army Theatre in Lublin. In 1948 in Łódź she directed her first spectacle, Bolesław Prus' Omyłka. In the years of 1950–1952, 1957–1958 and the 1964–1972 she was an actress and director of Juliusz Słowacki Theatre in Kraków. During the years of 1953–1954 Zamkow was an artistic director of Teatr Wybrzeże in Gdańsk. Then she was an actor and director of the Polish Army Theatre (now Teatr Dramatyczny) in Warsaw (1954–1957) and the Old Theatre in Kraków where she directed under pseudonym Słomczyńska (1958–1964). During the years of 1972–1974 she was a director of Teatr Studio in Warsaw. In later years Zamkow collaborated with many theatres in Poland and directed spectacles for Teatr TV. In the years of 1950–1953 she was a lecturer of the State Academy of Drama in Łódź.

Zamkow died on 19 June 1982 in Warsaw.

== Notable works ==
Year	Play	Author	Theatre	Type	Role	Note
1944	The Wedding	Stanisław Wyspiański	Polish Army Theatre, Lublin	Actor	Isia	Debut role
1948	A Mistake	Bolesław Prus	Powszechny Theatre, Łódź	Director	—	Debut direction
1953	Barbarians	Maxim Gorky	Teatr Wybrzeże, Gdańsk	Director	—	
1958	The Visit	Friedrich Dürrenmatt	Juliusz Słowacki Theatre, Kraków	Director and Actor	Claire Zachanassian	
1960	The Lower Depths	Maxim Gorky	Old Theatre, Kraków	Director	—	Under pseudonym Słomczyńska
1962	Mother Courage and Her Children	Bertolt Brecht	Old Theatre, Kraków	Director and Actor	Mother Courage	Under pseudonym Słomczyńska
1963	Caligula	Albert Camus	Old Theatre, Kraków	Director and Actor	Caesonia	Under pseudonym Słomczyńska
1966	Macbeth	William Shakespeare	Juliusz Słowacki Theatre, Kraków	Director and Actor	Lady Macbeth	
1969	The Wedding	Stanisław Wyspiański	Juliusz Słowacki Theatre, Kraków	Director	—	
1972	For Whom the Bell Tolls	Ernest Hemingway	Teatr Studio, Warsaw	Director	—	
