= Józef Poniatowski Park in Białystok =

Park in Białystok, Poland

Prince Józef Poniatowski Park
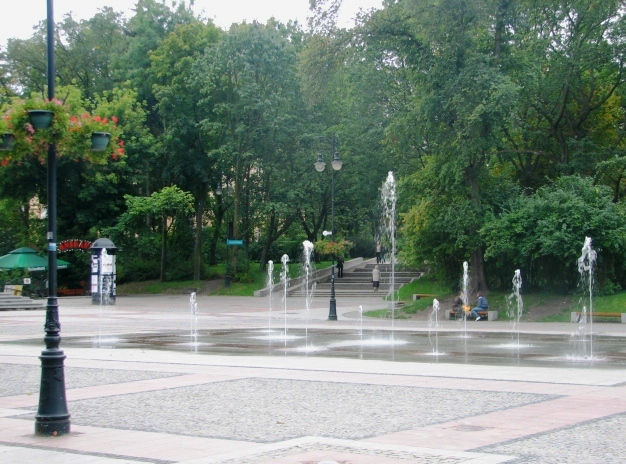
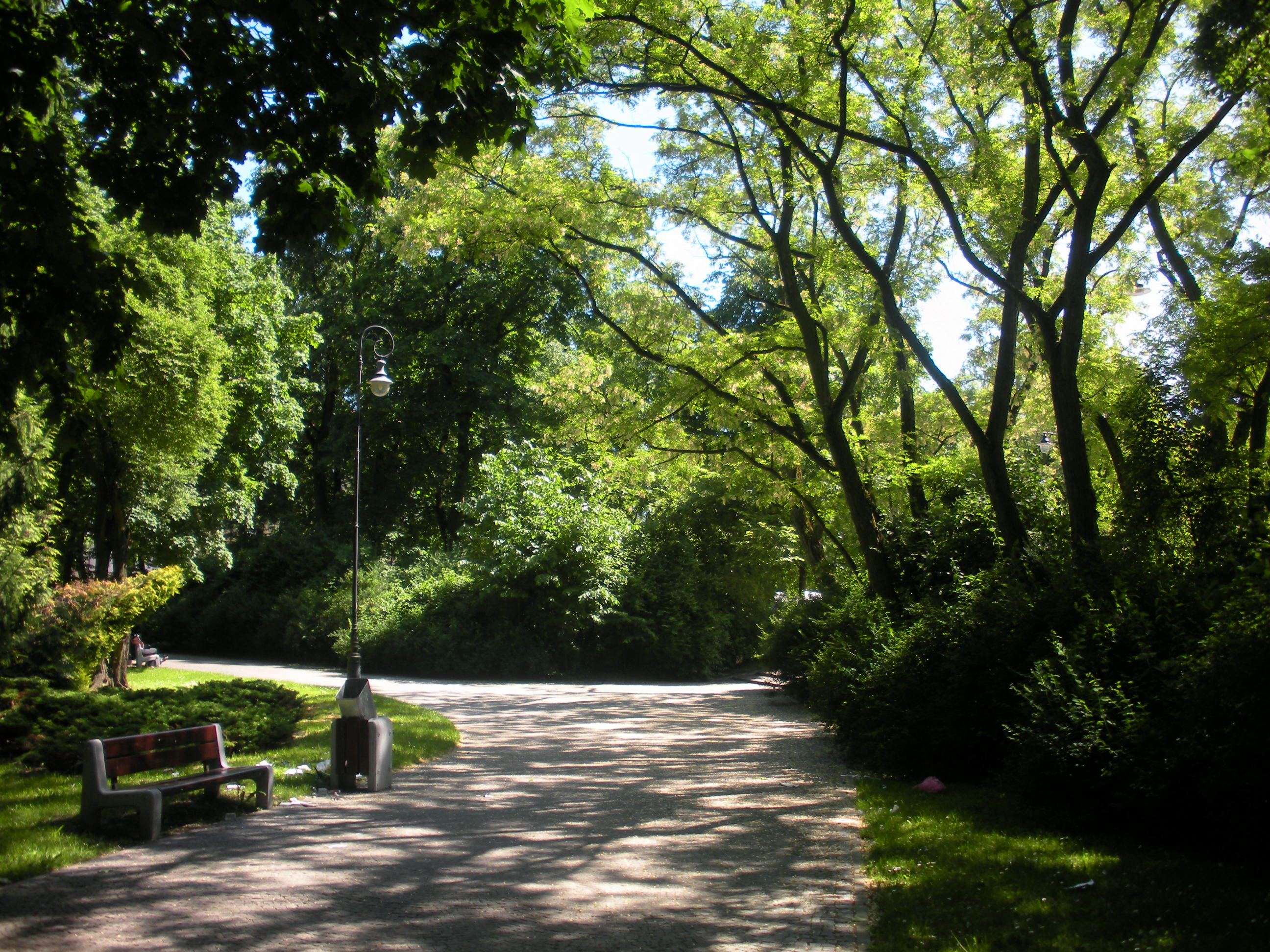
- Interactive map of Prince Józef Poniatowski Park
- Type: Municipal
- Location: Białystok
- Coordinates: 53°07′48″N 23°10′07″E
- Area: 4.8 ha
- Status: Open all year

Old Park named after Prince Józef Poniatowski (Polish: Park Stary im. księcia Józefa Poniatowskiego) a naturalistic park in Białystok with modernist elements located in the Centrum District of Białystok, capital of Podlaskie Voivodeship. Established in the years 1895–1897 on the site of a former mill pond on the Biała River, part of the composition of the palace gardens with an area of 4.76 ha in Białystok, it was designed by Walerian Kronenberg in cooperation with Teodor Chrząński.

== History ==
The park's designer was Walerian Kronenberg, one of the most outstanding creators of garden layouts in Poland, who lived at the turn of the 19th and 20th centuries. In 1989, to commemorate the 240th anniversary of granting city rights and the 70th anniversary of Białystok regaining independence, the park was named after Prince Józef Poniatowski. Currently, the name Park Stary is also used. It was recomposed in the years 1936–1938 according to a design by Stanisław Życiński Zadora. The park had an original spatial plan, symmetrical and regular, with a main avenue and side alleys, nooks and lawns. The park plan combined elements of a natural English park and a shaped French park. The interior on the south–north axis remained an open space with low greenery. The remaining part is covered with trees, some of which are remnants of urban forests.

At the beginning of the 21st century, the entire park square was rebuilt again, and in 2003, a stone sidewalk in the form of a fountain was made in front of the theater building, with water gushing out in many streams, directly from an underground reservoir. In 2007, some of the alleys were paved with stones and slabs, creating the central square of the park in the form of a rectangle, which was named Marshal Józef Piłsudski Square. The Aleksandr Węgierki Drama Theatre, Białystok (located officially in the address Elektryczna 12) built in 1933 is located in the park.
