= Jerzy Makarewicz =

Polish painter (1907–1944)

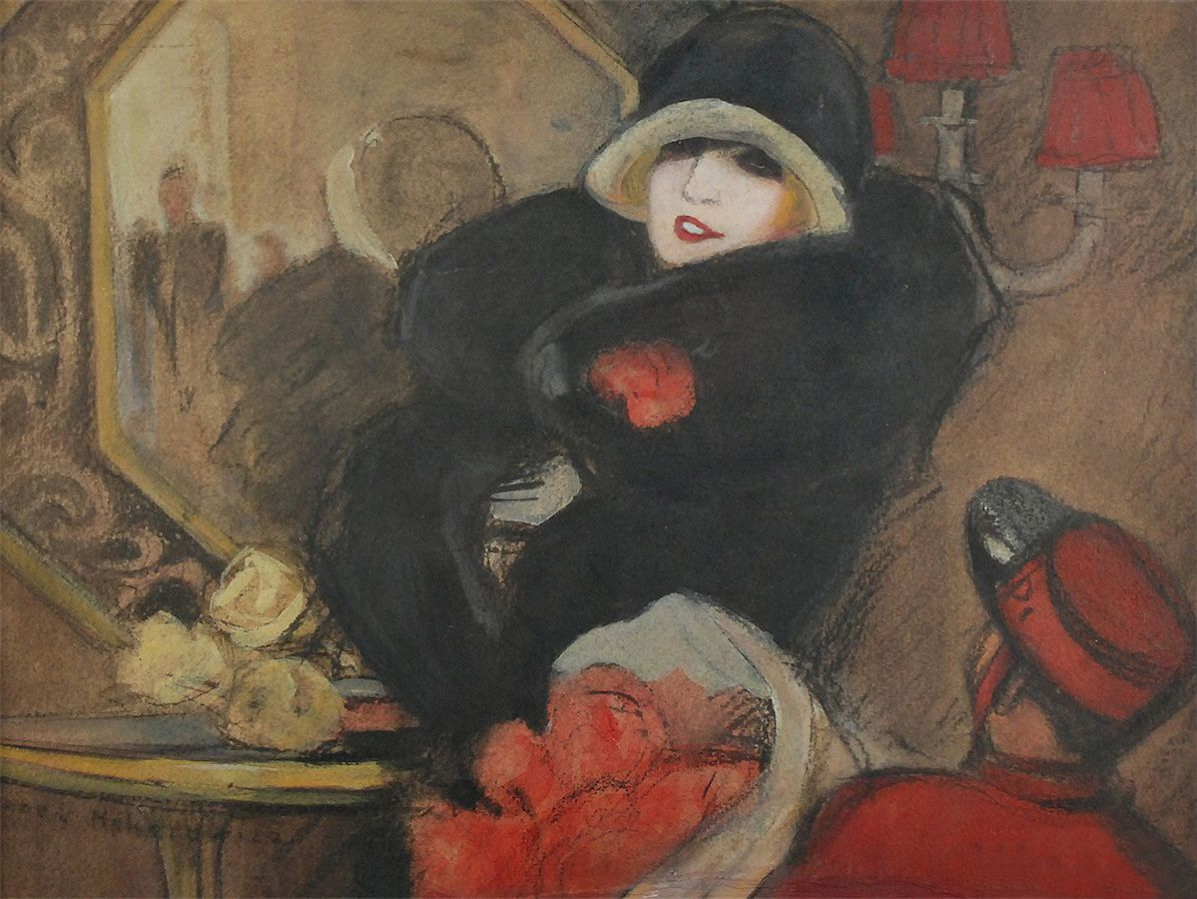
- The twenties, the thirties. Crayon, pastel, watercolor, cardboard.
- Born: Jerzy Makarewicz; 1907; Vienna, Austria
- Died: 1944 (aged 36–37); Kraków, Poland
- Education: Jan Matejko Academy of Fine Arts in Kraków
- Known for: Painting

Jerzy Makarewicz (1907–1944) was a Polish painter.

== Biography ==
In 1929, he began studying at the Jan Matejko Academy of Fine Arts in Kraków, where he was a student of Władysław Jarocki, and a year later, he advocated the artwork of Stanisław Szukalski, which in effect caused in him to be expelled from the institution. He moved to the School of Fine Arts in Warsaw, where he was taught by Tadeusz Pruszkowski. After completing his studies, he moved to Kraków, where he was taught by Fryderyk Pautsch. In 1936, he bought a circus wagon, and organised a travelling workshop (wędrująca pracownia) - which allowed him to work while travelling. In 1943, he was arrested and imprisoned in Kraków, a year later he was murdered in the Płaszów Concentration Camp.

Jerzy Makarewicz painted still life, portraits and landscape paintings. He was inspired by Flemish paintings, which added weight to the type of colours he used while painting his artwork. In 1973, his works were exhibited at the Society of Friends of Fine Arts (Towarzystwo Przyjaciół Sztuk Pięknych).

Jerzy Makarewicz was the son of Juliusz Makarewicz (1854–1936), and the brother of Maciej Makarewicz (1912–2009).

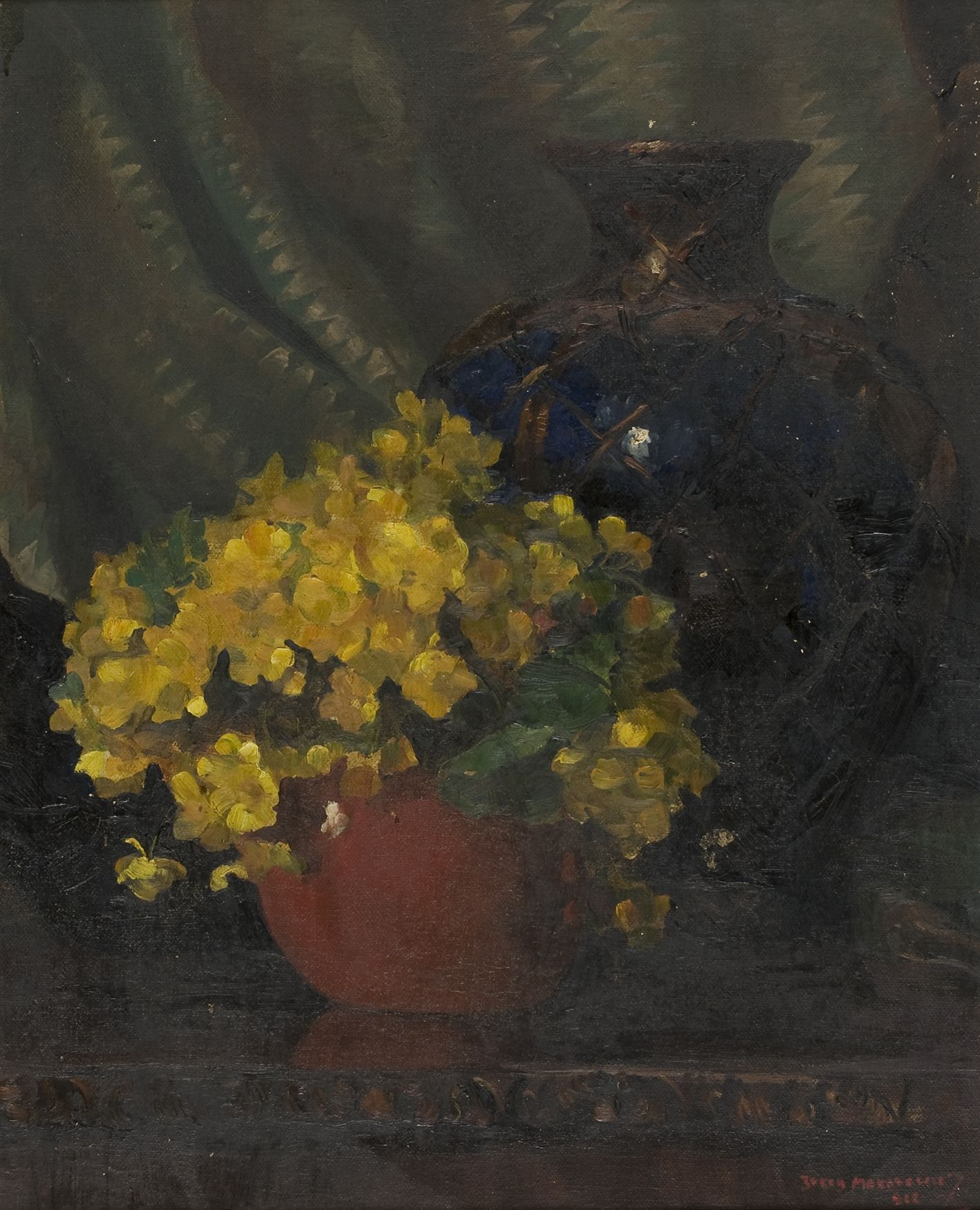
Marigolds
(1922)

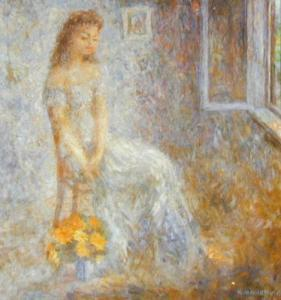
Portrait of Lidia Zamków
(1942)
