= Białystok Puppet Theatre =

Puppet theatre in Białystok, Poland

Bialystok Puppet Theater
- Białostocki Teatr Lalek
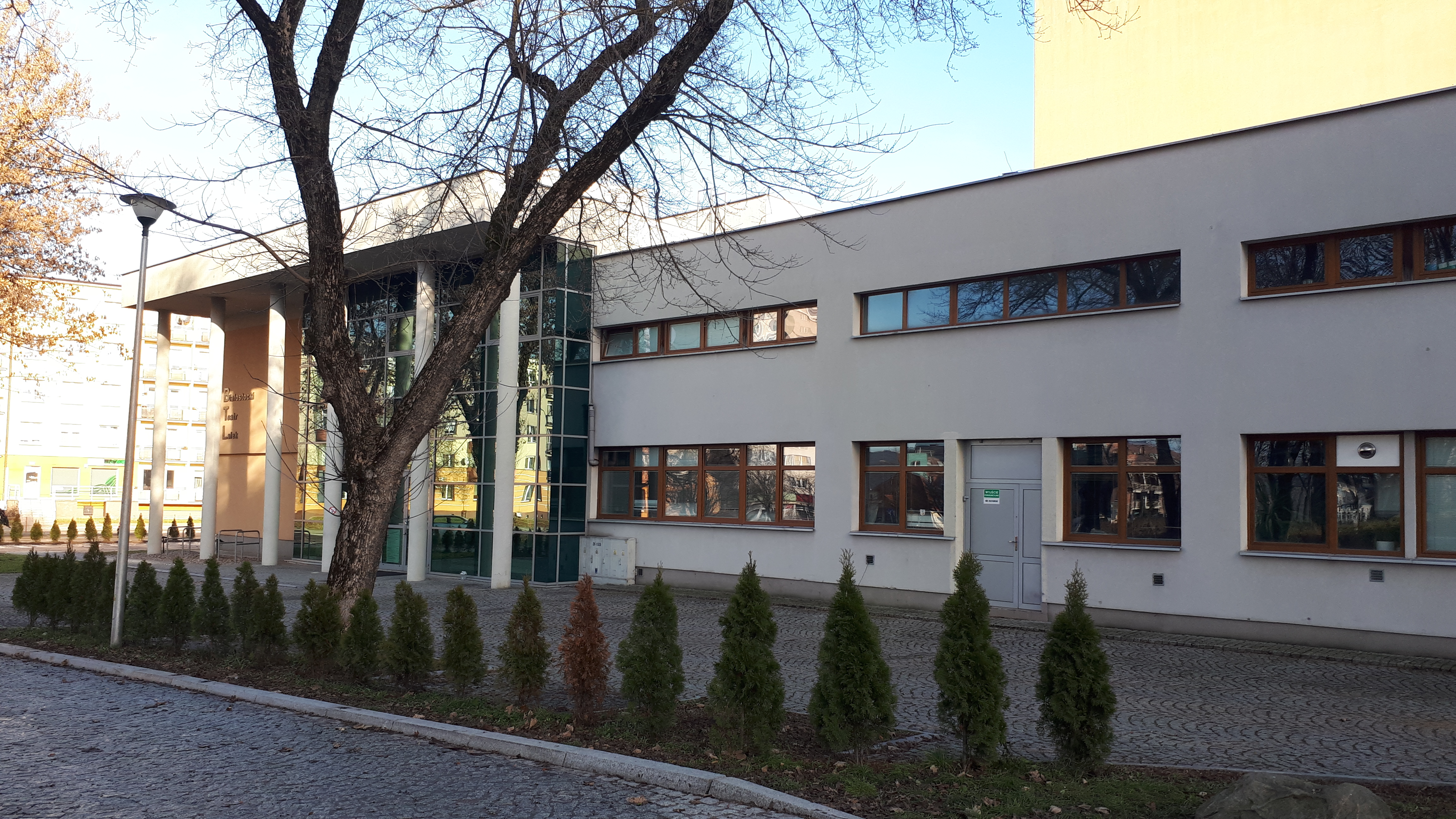
- Theatre building in 1 Kalinowskiego Street
- Interactive map of Bialystok Puppet Theater
- Address: 1 Kalinowskiego Street; Białystok; Poland
- Coordinates: 53°07′50.88″N 23°09′36″E

Construction
- Years active: 1953 - present

Website
- https://www.btl.bialystok.pl

Bialystok Puppet Theatre (Polish: Białostocki Teatr Lalek), founded in 1953, is one of the oldest puppet theaters in Poland. Its repertoire consists mainly of puppetry-based adaptations of international literature, as well as children's entertainment.

== History ==
Bialystok Puppet Theatre's history began in 1937, when it was founded as a small amateur theater by puppeteers Helena Pacewicz and Piotr Sawicki. It was incarnated in its current form in 1953, when the Communist government's Ministry of Culture and National Heritage granted it a subsidy and the status of a professional stage. Nationalization followed in 1960, followed by an increase in government investment in the theatre. In 1972, a still-extant stage for adult puppet theatre was built. This was the first-ever such stage in Poland. An actor study for training in puppetry was founded shortly thereafter in 1974; this study ultimately became the Puppetry Department of the Aleksander Zelwerowicz National Academy of Dramatic Art in Warsaw.

Between 1975 and 1979, a permanent building was erected at 1 Kalinowskiego St. The Bialystok Puppet Theatre is still housed in this building today. This building today houses three stages: a large stage, which seats 200, a small stage, which seats 100, and a rehearsal room, which seats 40.

Notable former puppeteers of the Bialystok Puppet Theater include Jan Wilkowski, Krzysztof Rau, and Piotr Tomaszuk.

== Cultural impact ==
Bialystok Puppet Theatre organized the All-Poland Competition of Puppet Theatre Soloists, Poland's first-ever nationwide solo puppeteer competition, in 1972, and subsequently ran it as a biennial event. In 1977, the theatre began permitting non-Polish entrants and restyled the event as the International Festival of Puppeteers, leading to the participation of entrants from across Europe, most notably German puppeteer Albrecht Roser. Recent theatre directors have also permitted non-Polish puppeteers to perform directly at Bialystok.

In the 1990s, the BPT, under the lead of playwright Wojciech Szelachowski, helped further modernize Polish puppet theatre by launching postmodernist, sometimes sans-puppet performances, several of which were inspired by the post-WW1 Dada art movement.
