= Aleksander Węgierko Drama Theatre =

Theatre in Białystok, Poland

- Teatr Dramatyczny im. Aleksandra Węgierki w Białymstoku
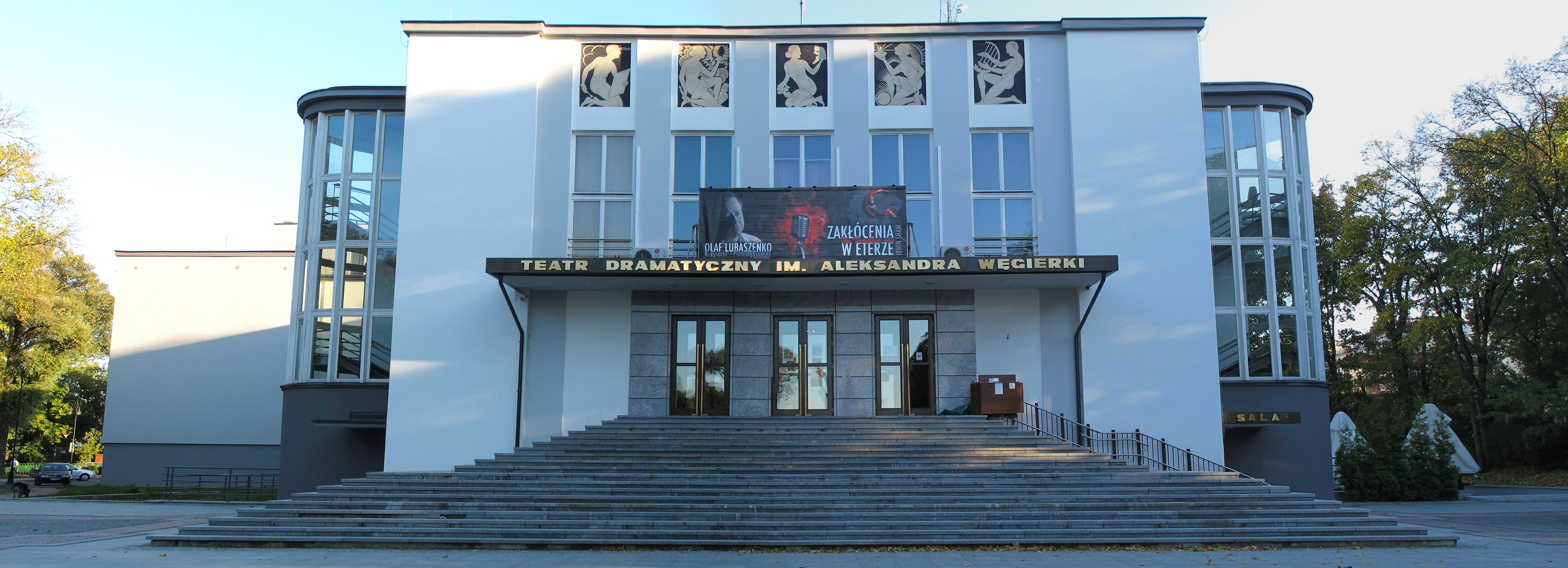
- Main entrance to the theatre
- Interactive map of Aleksander Węgierko Drama Theatre
- Address: 12 Elektryczna Street; Białystok; Poland
- Coordinates: 53°07′47.51″N 23°10′9.47″E
- Type: repertory theatre

Construction
- Opened: 1938; 88 years ago

The Aleksander Węgierko Drama Theatre in Białystok (Polish: Teatr Dramatyczny im. Aleksandra Węgierki w Białymstoku) is a repertory theatre in Białystok, established in 1938. It was founded by actor Aleksander Węgierko.

== History ==
The theatre has its origins in 1912 when the Teatr Palace, it was situated between Ritz Hotel and the Guests Palace and was owned by two Jewish businessmen, Hurwica and Herman. From 1920 to 1928 an independent group called Yehuda Grynjoz group was active. Constant appeals to build the Polish Theatre. The press saw such a facility as a "purifying and Polonizing factor for our city". Efforts to create a Polish theatre had been ongoing since Poland regained independence. For this purpose, the "Polish Theatre" Society was established under the leadership of Marian Dederko. Temporary solutions were therefore proposed. On September 13, 1924, the Municipal Theatre was officially opened with its seat in the Palace. It was formed by a 30-person team led by Bronislaw Skąpski. In 1933, however, a new Committee for the Construction of the Marshal Józef Piłsudski People's House was established. Its members included government comissar Seweryn Nowakowski, priest Aleksander Chodyko, Jewish businessman Szymon Wajnrach, pastor Piotr Gorodiszcz and journalist Jakub Szapiro. On 30 September 1933, a notarial deed was signed at the office of notary Wacław Gąsiorowski, in which Seweryn Nowakowski, the Government Commissioner of the Białystok City Council, transferred the building of the People's House free of charge to the construction committee.

In 1938, the building of the Municipal Theatre – Marshal Józef Piłsudski People's Home (Polish: Teatr Miejski – Dom Ludowy im. Marszałka Józefa Piłsudskiego) located at the Poniatowski Park was completed. Shortly after Christmas, a performance of Cydzik & Co (Polish: Cydzik i spółka) was staged there, as the first performance in this building.

In 1940, a group of distinguished Warsaw actors, under the guidance of Aleksander Węgierko, came to Białystok fleeing from the Germans. Their stay in Białystok was short, but pivotal, since they created the first permanent company in the theatre. They produced such plays as Intrigue and Love by Friedrich Schiller, Life Pension by Aleksander Fredro, and Pygmalion by George B. Shaw. The most popular event though was a Mickiewicz evening, consisting of excerpts of Pan Tadeusz, Konrad Wallenrod and Forefathers’ Eve (Polish: Dziady). The performances were all in Polish and the national anthem was sung, all this at the time when Białystok belonged to the Byelorussian Soviet Socialist Republic.

This episode finished in 1941. While the company was giving guest performances in Minsk and Brest, the Operation Barbarossa broke out. On the way back, some of the artists, including Węgierko, were arrested by the Germans and never returned to Białystok. The theatre itself also suffered: part of the building was burnt while the city was being bombarded.

Shortly after the liberation of the city, a handful of artists who had survived the war and could not immediately return to Warsaw or Kraków, where war was still waging, took cover in Białystok. Joanna Błońska, Halina Kossobudzka, Halina Czengery, Lidia Zamkow, Marian Meller (the first postwar managing director), Jan Świderski, and Czesław Wołłejko made up the first company after the war, and were soon joined by Białystok actors. As early as on 22 September 1944 they premiered My Quail Has Fled (Polish: Uciekła mi przepióreczka) by Stefan Żeromski, which was the first performance in post-war Poland.

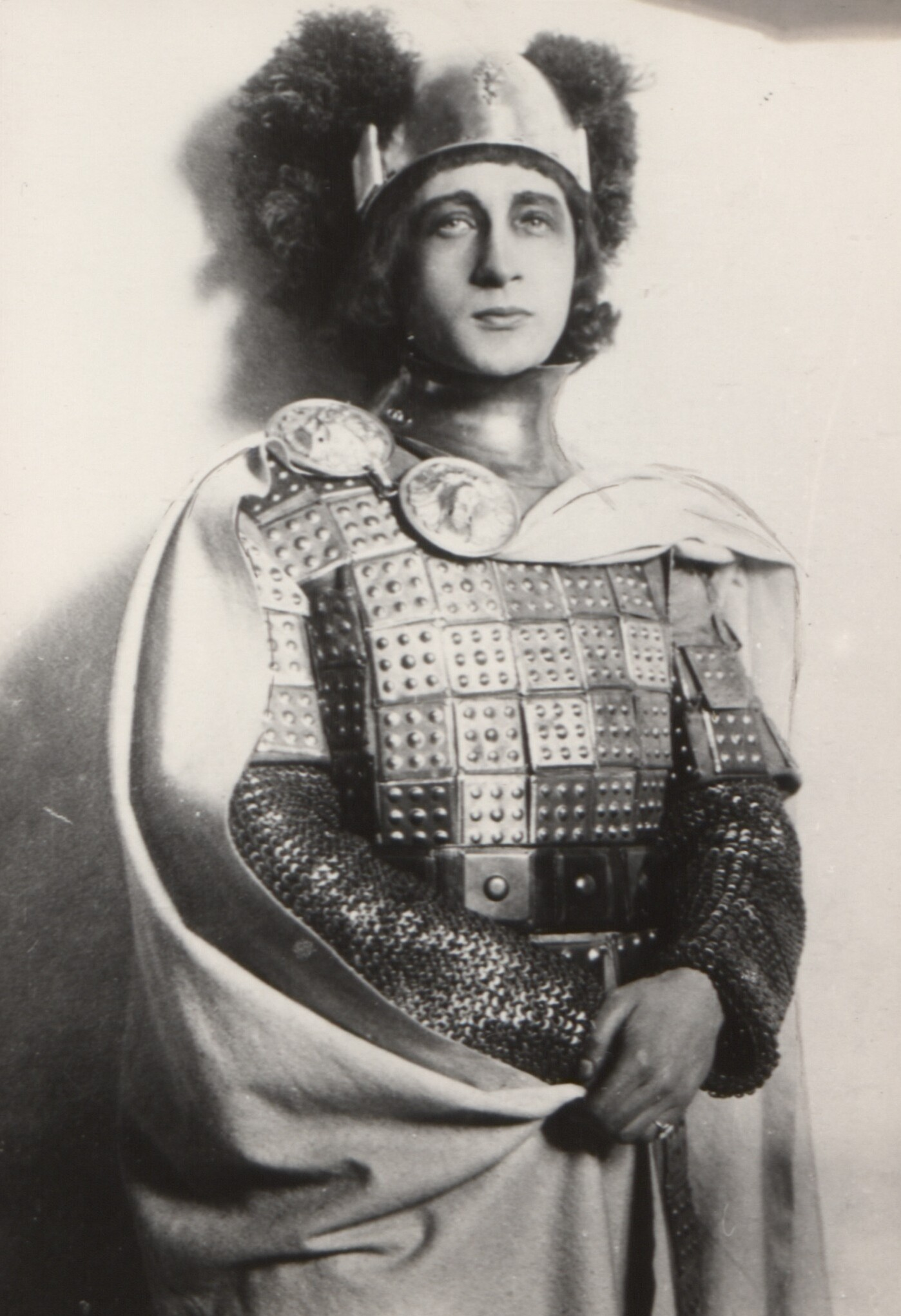
Aleksander Węgierko (1893–1941), Polish-Jewish actor and theatre director

In 1948 the opening Committee of the rebuilt Municipal Theater was established, consisting of Andrzej Krzewniak, mayor of Białystok, Jan Lech, vice-president of Białystok, Władysław Szypulski, director of the Theater and Marian Józefowicz, head of the Department of Culture and Art of the City Hall in Białystok. It was decided to invite to the ceremony, among others, Stefan Dybowski, Minister of Culture and Art (AND in 1945–1947 the voivode of Białystok) and 70 guests from Białystok. The Committee asked the City Board for financial resources for a special banquet. On September 23, 1948, in the partially rebuilt Municipal Theater, the premiere of Molière's "Świętoszko" took place, directed by Stanisław Daczyński, with the set design by Otto Axer.

At the turn of 1948 and 1949, the authorities began to introduce changes to the legal status of theaters. From institutions subordinated to local government authorities, they were transformed into state-owned enterprises. In accordance with that policy, the National Municipal Council in Białystok submitted a request to the Ministry of Culture and Art for the nationalization of the Municipal Theater. The Ministry formally agreed with and called for the theatre to be renamed. The editors of the Białystok edition of Trybuna Ludu, the Communist party mouthpiece proposed that the inhabitants of Białystok choose the name. However, in April 1949, the director of the Theatre, Władysław Szypulski, and representatives of the local branch of the Association of Polish Stage Artists applied to the Ministry of Culture and Art for approval of the name Aleksander Węgierka Theater. They justified it by the fact that the name was associated with Białystok, where the Aleksander Węgierko Theater ran in 1939–1941. In May 1949, the Minister of Culture and Art established a state-owned enterprise called the State Theater Aleksandr Węgierki in Białystok. On September 1, 1949, Władysław Szypulski was appointed director, who was also entrusted with the function of artistic director of the Theatre.

In the ceremony marking 75 years since it was established, Voivodeship Marshal of Podlaskie, Artur Kosicki announced a major reconstruction of the theatre's premises. During the ceremony, several theater employees were also honored and awarded medals. Director Piotr Półtorak received the badge of Merit for Polish Culture.
