= Alfons Karny =

Polish sculptor

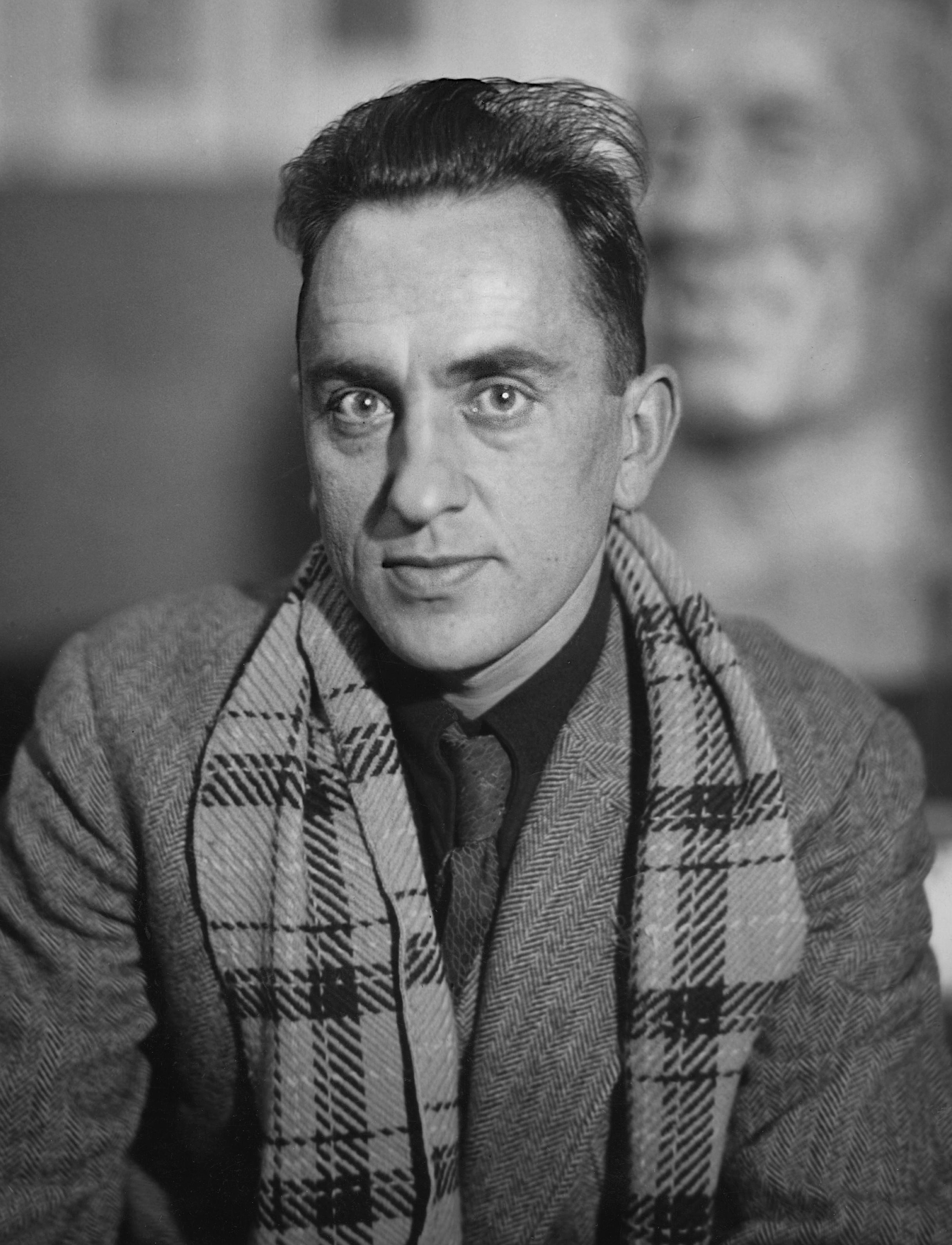
- Born: 14 November 1901; Białystok, Poland
- Died: 14 August 1989 (aged 87); Warsaw, Poland
- Occupation: Sculptor

Alfons Karny (14 November 1901 – 14 August 1989) was a Polish sculptor. He created portraits and busts which included celebrities such as Albert Einstein, Ignacy Paderewski, Ernest Hemingway, also, he predominantly used bronze and granite for creating his works. Because of Warsaw Uprising, his works was destroyed in 5 years between 1939 and 1944.

His work named as Girl With A Jumping Rope was part of the sculpture event in the art competition at the 1932 Summer Olympics.
