= University Children Clinical Hospital in Białystok =

University Children Clinical Hospital in Białystok Uniwersytecki Dziecięcy Szpital Kliniczny im. L. Zamenhofa w Białymstoku
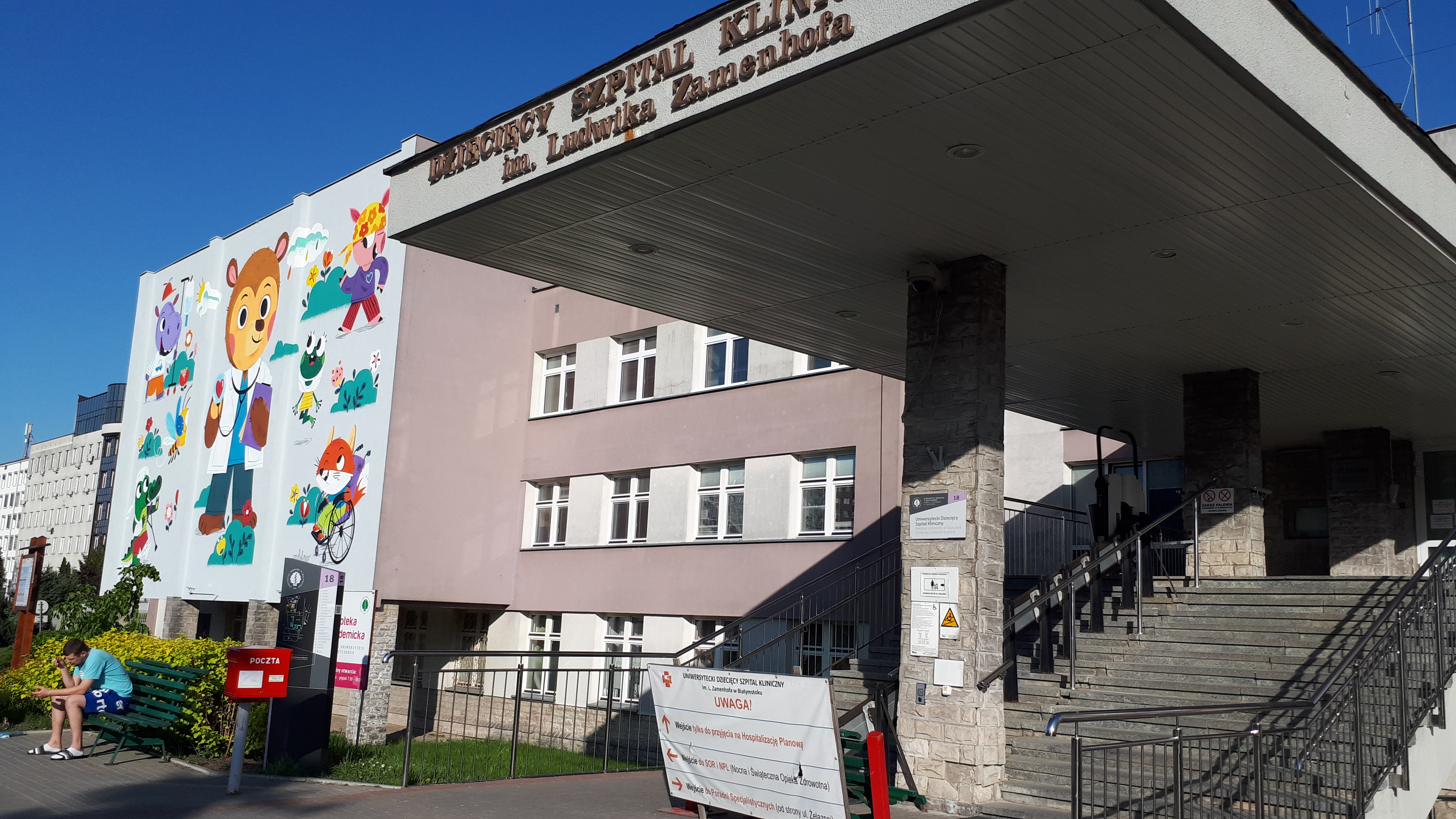

Geography
- Location: Białystok, Podlaskie Voivodeship, Poland
- Coordinates: 53°07′25″N 23°09′22″E

Organisation
- Care system: National Health Fund
- Type: Children's hospital
- Affiliated university: Medical University of Białystok
- Patron: L. L. Zamenhof

Services
- Emergency department: Yes
- Beds: 350 (2018)

Helipads
- Helipad: yes

History
- Founded: 1979 (formally 1988)

Links
- Website: http://www.udsk.pl
- Lists: Hospitals in Poland

Ludwig Zamenhoff University Children Clinical Hospital in Białystok (Polish: Uniwersytecki Dziecięcy Szpital Kliniczny im. L. Zamenhofa w Białymstoku) is a children hospital in the Piaski district of Białystok, Poland. The hospital is the largest children's hospital in north-eastern Poland. It contains 15 clinics and departments, trauma center for children, emergency ward, over 350 beds, over 250 doctors and more than 400 nurses. In 2018 it treated about 20,000 patients in hospitalization as well as 120,000 in specialist clinics.

== History ==
The idea to create a children's hospital was born in the 1970s. At this time the Białystok Voivodeship had the lowest rate of hospital beds per 1,000 children as well as lack of academic pediatrics. At that time, the name "clinical pediatrics center of Białystok" Polish: Białostocki ośrodek pediatrii klinicznej was used. Efforts to start the investment were started by prof. Maria Rudobielska (head of the Institute of Pediatrics at the Medical University of Białystok at that time). It involved the then city and voivodeship authorities, university authorities (Rector Konstanty Wiśniewski) and others. As a result, on November 1, 1974, the Social Committee for the Construction of the Provincial Child Health Center in Białystok was established. Its main purpose was to collect social cash and work towards starting construction. The university also began to distribute donations among public institutions and organizations. During the year, PLN 6.5 million was collected from donations. In 1975, technical documentation was prepared and the location of the investment was determined. The construction works were to start in 1976, but the economic crisis in the country caused the investment to be removed from the investment plan of the Ministry of Health three times. The situation was not made easier by the fact that the university - also due to this crisis - had problems with completing the construction of the Collegium Pathologicum building at 13 Waszyngtona street. The cornerstone for the construction of the Institute of Paediatrics was finally laid during the inauguration of the academic year in 1981. While construction was planned to be completed within 3.5 years the target failed due to economic hardships in Poland in the early 1980s and temporarily stopped. The breakthrough in the implementation of the investment happened in 1987-1990. On December 1, 1987, at the request of the then Rector of the Medical University of Białystok, prof. Zbigniew Puchalski, the minister of health Janusz Komender appointed prof. Maciej Kaczmarski to the position of hospital director. The first stage of construction was completed on October 1, 1988. During the inauguration of the academic year 1988-1989, the Children's and Youth Outpatient Clinic was opened. Order of the Minister of Health, Izabela Płaneta-Małecka, signed on December 22, 1988 formally established the University Children Clinical Hospital. The second stage of the investment implementation was performed by prof. Jan Górski. Buildings which were included in the original plan and were removed due to economic constrains were re-included and built (among them the Collegium Novum building at 15a Waszyngtona Street). Finally, in 2003, after 23 years of construction, the entire investment was officially completed. The last symbolic act was the opening of the Observation and Infection Clinic.

In June 2021 an agreement was signed between the hospital and Minister of Health Adam Niedzielski on a general reconstruction of the hospital with a budget of 36 million zlotych with works due to finish by June 2023. In October 2022 the Psychiatric Center was opened, co-financed by the Podlaskie Voivodeship Marshal's Office and the central Polish government, and house a new day-hospitalization department for psychiatric care. The Center was constructed at 2 Wołodyjowskiego Street, in the place of the former so-called the "Swedish House", which was once the seat of the hospital administration and demolished in 2017.

In 2024 it was announced that the hospital will be expanded with new construction to be taken place on some of the hospital's parking next to Waszyngtona street.
