= List of hospitals in Poland =

The following is a listing of the clinical and university hospitals in Poland:

- Medical University of Białystok

- Uniwersytecki Szpital Kliniczny, Białystok
- Uniwersytecki Dziecięcy Szpital Kliniczny im. dr Ludwika Zamenhofa, Białystok

- Collegium Medicum in Bydgoszcz of the Nicolaus Copernicus University

- Szpital Uniwersytecki nr 1 im. dr Antoniego Jurasza, Bydgoszcz
- Szpital Uniwersytecki nr 2 im. dr Jana Biziela, Bydgoszcz
- Wojskowy Szpital Kliniczny z Polikliniką, Bydgoszcz

- Collegium Medicum of the Nicolaus Copernicus University in Ciechocinek

- Uzdrowiskowy Szpital Kliniczny, Ciechocinek

- Medical University of Gdańsk

- Uniwersyteckie Centrum Kliniczne, Gdańsk

- Medical University of Gdańsk in Gdynia

- Uniwersyteckie Centrum Medycyny Morskiej i Tropikalnej, Gdynia

- Medical University of Silesia in Katowice

- Centralny Szpital Kliniczny im. prof. Kornela Gibińskiego, Katowice
- Samodzielny Publiczny Szpital Kliniczny im. Andrzeja Mielęckiego, Katowice
- Samodzielny Publiczny Szpital Kliniczny nr 5 - Szpital okulistyczny, Katowice
- Górnośląskie Centrum Zdrowia Dziecka, Katowice
- Górnośląskie Centrum Medyczne, Katowice

- Jagiellonian University Medical College

- Szpital Uniwersytecki, Kraków
- Uniwersytecka Klinika Stomatologiczna, Kraków
- Uniwersytecki Szpital Dziecięcy, Kraków

- Wojskowy Szpital Kliniczny z Polikliniką, Kraków
- Medical University of Lublin in Lublin

- Samodzielny Publiczny Szpital Kliniczny nr 1, Lublin
- Samodzielny Publiczny Szpital Kliniczny nr 4, Lublin
- Dziecięcy Szpital Kliniczny im. prof. Antoniego Gębali, Lublin

- Wojskowy Szpital Kliniczny z Polikliniką, Lublin

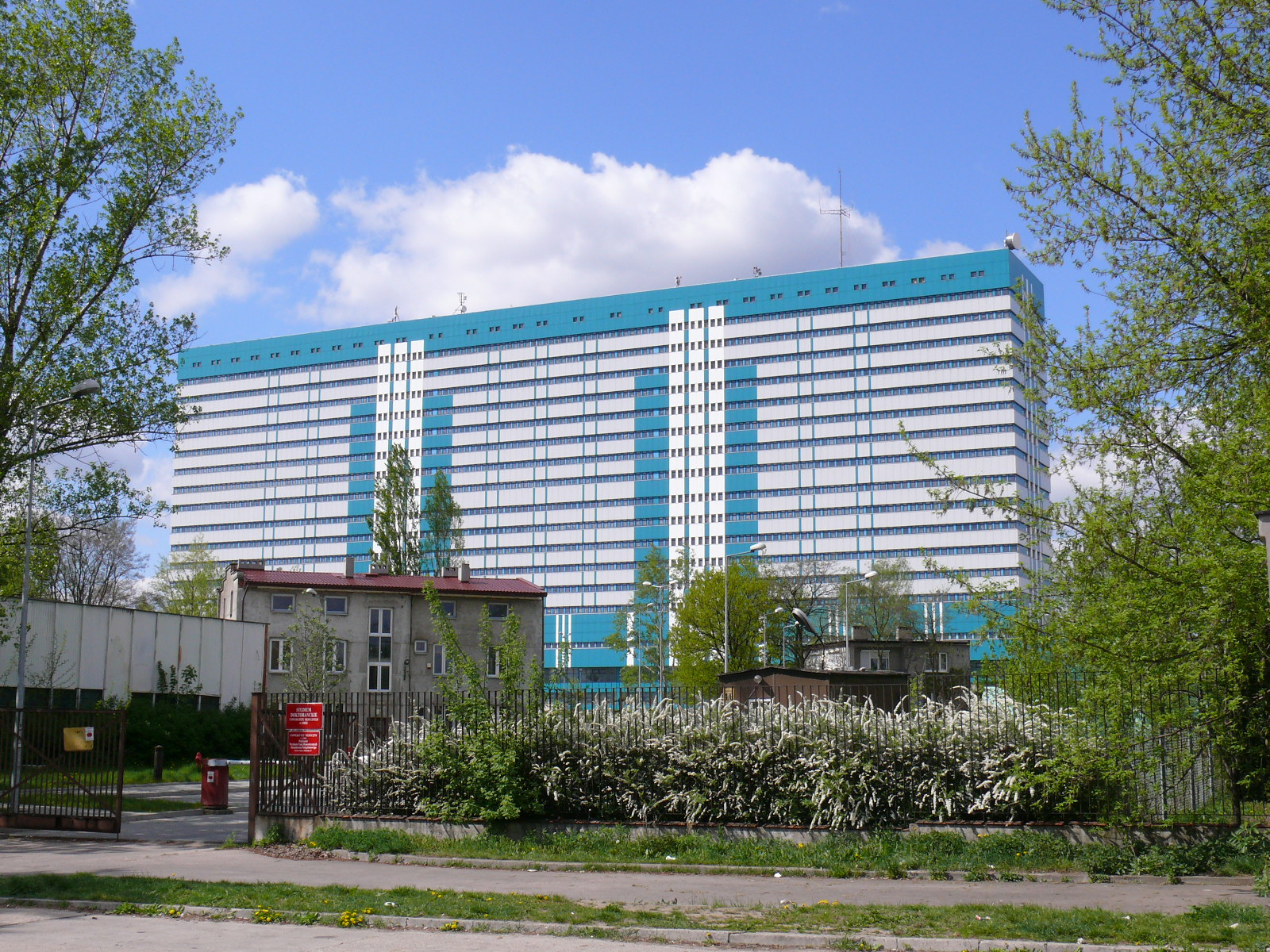
Centralny Szpital Kliniczny, Łódź

- Medical University of Łódź

- Central Clinical Hospital of the Medical University in Łódź,
- Uniwersytecki Szpital Kliniczny nr 1 im. Norberta Barlickiego, Łódź
- Uniwersytecki Szpital Kliniczny nr 2 im. Wojskowej Akademii Medycznej, Łódź
- Uniwersytecki Szpital Kliniczny nr 3 im. dr Seweryna Sterlinga, Łódź
- Uniwersytecki Szpital Kliniczny nr 4 im. Marii Konopnickiej, Łódź
- Uniwersytecki Szpital Kliniczny nr 5 im. gen. dyw. Bolesława Szareckiego, Łódź
- Uniwersytecki Szpital Kliniczny nr 6 – Instytut Stomatologii, Łódź

- Medical Sciences Faculty of the University of Warmia and Mazury, Olsztyn

- Uniwersytecki Szpital Kliniczny, Olsztyn

- Centrum Medyczne Kształcenia Podyplomowego, Otwock

- Samodzielny Publiczny Szpital Kliniczny im. prof. Adama Grucy, Otwock

- Pomeranian Medical University

- Samodzielny Publiczny Szpital Kliniczny nr 1 im. prof. Tadeusza Sokołowskiego, Police (pronounced [pɔˈlʲit͡sɛ])

- Poznań University of Medical Sciences

- Szpital Kliniczny Przemienienia Pańskiego, Poznań
- Szpital Kliniczny im. Heliodora Święcickiego, Poznań
- Ginekologiczno-Położniczy Szpital Kliniczny, Poznań
- Ortopedyczno-Rehabilitacyjny Szpital Kliniczny im. Wiktora Degi, Poznań
- Szpital Kliniczny im. Karola Jonschera, Poznań
- Specjalistyczny Szpital Kliniczny Uniwersytetu Medycznego, Poznań

- Pomeranian Medical University

- Samodzielny Publiczny Szpital Kliniczny nr 1 im. prof. Tadeusza Sokołowskiego, Szczecin
- Samodzielny Publiczny Szpital Kliniczny nr 2, Szczecin

- University of Rzeszów

- Szpital Kliniczny Uniwersytetu Rzeszowskiego/Rzeszów University Clinical Hospital, Rzeszów

- Medical University of Warsaw

- Samodzielny Publiczny Centralny Szpital Kliniczny, Warsaw
- Samodzielny Publiczny Dziecięcy Szpital Kliniczny, Warsaw
- Samodzielny Publiczny Kliniczny Szpital Okulistyczny, Warsaw
- Szpital Kliniczny Dzieciątka Jezus, Warsaw
- Szpital Kliniczny im. Księżnej Anny Mazowieckiej, Warsaw

- Centrum Medyczne Kształcenia Podyplomowego, Warsaw

- Samodzielny Publiczny Szpital Kliniczny im. prof. Witolda Orłowskiego, Warsaw

- Ministerstwo Spraw Wewnętrznych i Administracji, Warsaw

- Centralny Szpital Kliniczny Ministerstwa Spraw Wewnętrznych i Administracji, Warsaw

- Wojskowy Instytut Medyczny, Warsaw

- Centralny Szpital Kliniczny Ministerstwa Obrony Narodowej, Warsaw

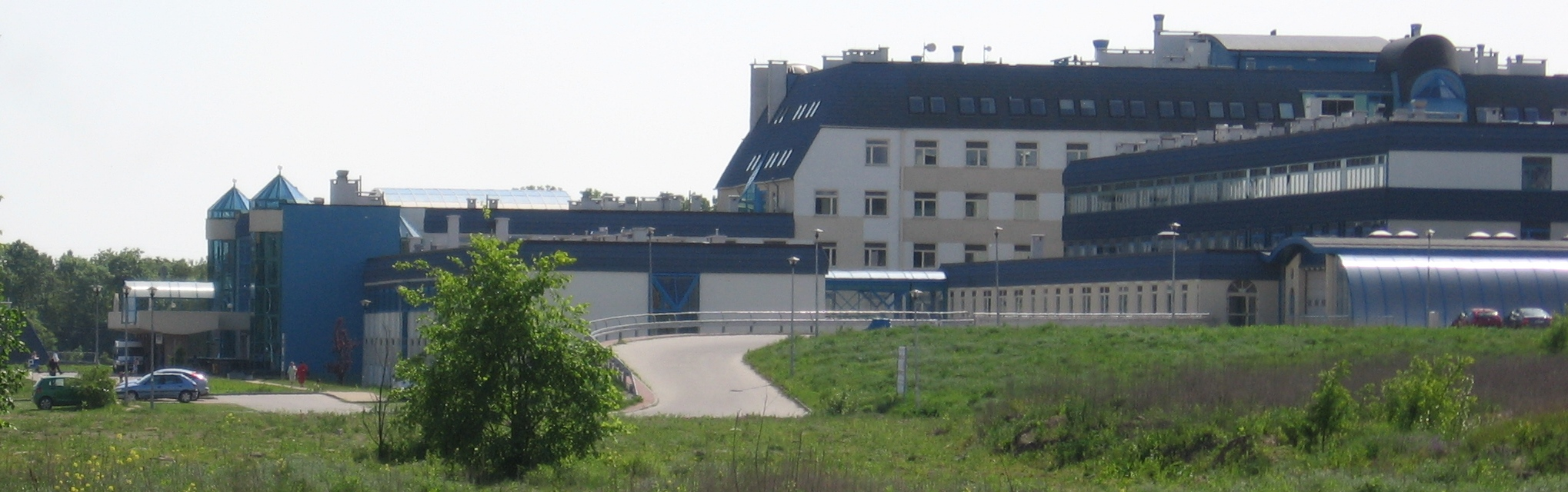
Clinical university hospital in Wrocław

- Wrocław Medical University, Wrocław

- Samodzielny Publiczny Szpital Kliniczny nr 1, Wrocław
- Akademicki Szpital Kliniczny im. Jana Mikulicza-Radeckiego, Wrocław
- Akademicka Klinika Stomatologiczna, Wrocław

- Siły Zbrojne Rzeczypospolitej Polskiej, Wrocław

- Wojskowy Szpital Kliniczny z Polikliniką, Wrocław

- Medical University of Silesia in Katowice

- Samodzielny Publiczny Szpital Kliniczny nr 1 im. prof. Stanisława Szyszko, Zabrze
- Samodzielny Publiczny Szpital Kliniczny nr 3, Zabrze

- Jagiellonian University Medical College, Zakopane

- Uniwersytecki Szpital Ortopedyczno-Rehabilitacyjny, Zakopane

== Selected public and other hospitals ==
- Specialist Hospital in Jasło
- Children's Clinical Hospital, Kraków
- Krakowski Szpital Specjalistyczny im. Jana Pawła II, Kraków
- University Hospital, Kraków
- Państwowy Szpital Kliniczny Nr4, Lublin
- University Hospital, Łódź
- SPZOZ, Puławy
- The County Hospital, Sanok
- Carolina Medical Center in Warsaw
- Children’s Memorial Health Institute, Warsaw
- Wojewódzki Szpital Specjalistyczny Chorób Płuc, Zakopane
- Medicover Hospital, Warsaw
- Wojewódzki Szpital Podkarpacki im. Jana Pawa II w Krośnie, Krosno
- Wojewódzki Szpital Zakaźny w Warszawie (Warsaw)
- Wojewódzki Szpital Zespolony, Nowy Sącz
- Szpital Św. Wojciecha Poznań

== See also ==
- Health care in Poland
