= University Clinical Hospital in Białystok =

University Clinical Hospital in Bialystok Uniwersytecki Szpital Kliniczny w Białymstoku
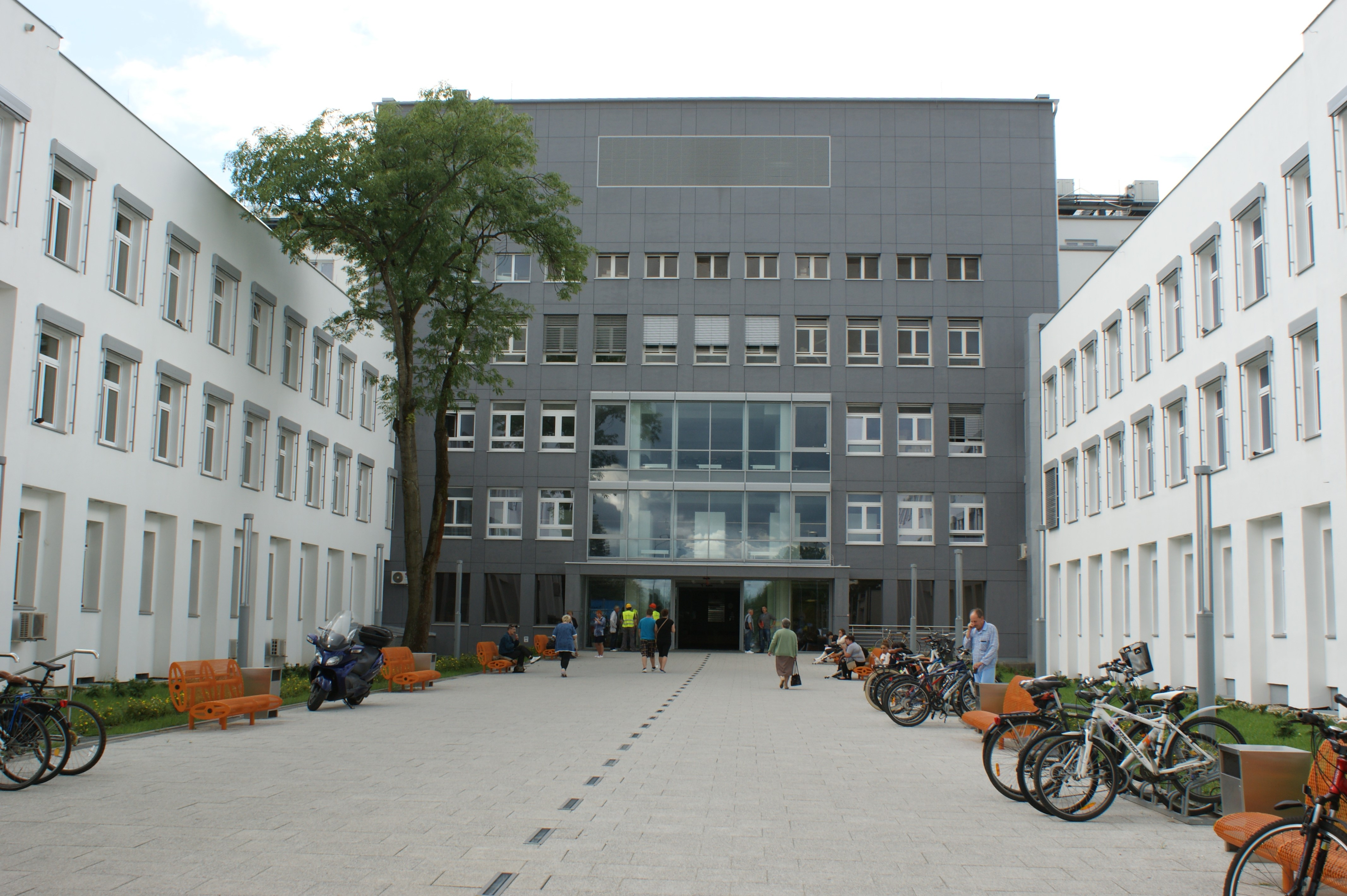

Geography
- Location: Białystok, Podlaskie Voivodeship, Poland
- Coordinates: 53.124487733°N 23.1591361005°E

Organisation
- Care system: National Health Fund
- Affiliated university: Medical University of Białystok

Services
- Emergency department: Yes

Helipads
- Helipad: yes

History
- Founded: 1955

Links
- Website: http://www.uskwb.pl
- Lists: Hospitals in Poland

University Clinical Hospital in Białystok (Polish: Uniwersytecki Szpital Kliniczny w Białymstoku) is a university hospital and the largest medical facility in Podlaskie Voivodeship, a province located in north-eastern Poland. It has 26 clinics with 836 beds, where over 36,000 are treated annually. There are also 30 Specialist Outpatient Facilities within the hospital. Outpatient clinics are closely related to clinics and carry out specialist diagnostic and therapeutic activities on an outpatient basis. In total, over 2.5 thousand employees are employed there, of them 760 doctors and over 800 nurses. Approximately 55,000 patients are hospitalized at the UMB Clinical Hospital yearly, and approximately 203,000 patients are provided with consultations.

== History ==
The decision to build the University Clinical Hospital (formerly the State Clinical Hospital, (Polish: Państwowy szpital kliniczny) was made in 1955 during the jubilee celebrations of the fifth anniversary of the Medical University of Bialystok. The architect of the hospital building was Wanda Binkuńska. It adapted the existing project (among others, on the basis of which voivodship hospitals in Warsaw and Lublin were built) for the needs of the Białystok hospital. The project was not modern and did not fully meet the needs of the clinical hospital, but provided a shortening of construction by three years. In January 1956, the first spade for the construction of was driven by workers from the Municipal Construction Enterprise (Polish: Białostockie Przedsiębiorstwo Budownictwa Miejskiego. The construction manager was Henryk Lebiedziński, a graduate of the Engineering College in Bialystok. At the time, it was the second-largest investment in the Białystok region after the plant in Fasty (Polish: Białostockie Zakłady Przemysłu Bawełnianego w Fastach).

Opened for use on December 15, 1962, the hospital was then one of the largest in Poland. It had about 750 beds (in that period all other Bialystok hospitals together had 800 beds) and employed about 1,000 people. Its capacity was reportedly equal to one-quarter of the size of the Palace of Culture and Science in Warsaw. To this day, due to its size, it is commonly called the "giant".

In 2018, at the hospital ended seven years modernization program, financed from the state budget, thorough reconstruction and modernization (cost PLN 500 million).
