= Branicki Palace, Białystok =

Historic building in Białystok, Poland

Branicki Palace
- Pałac Branickich
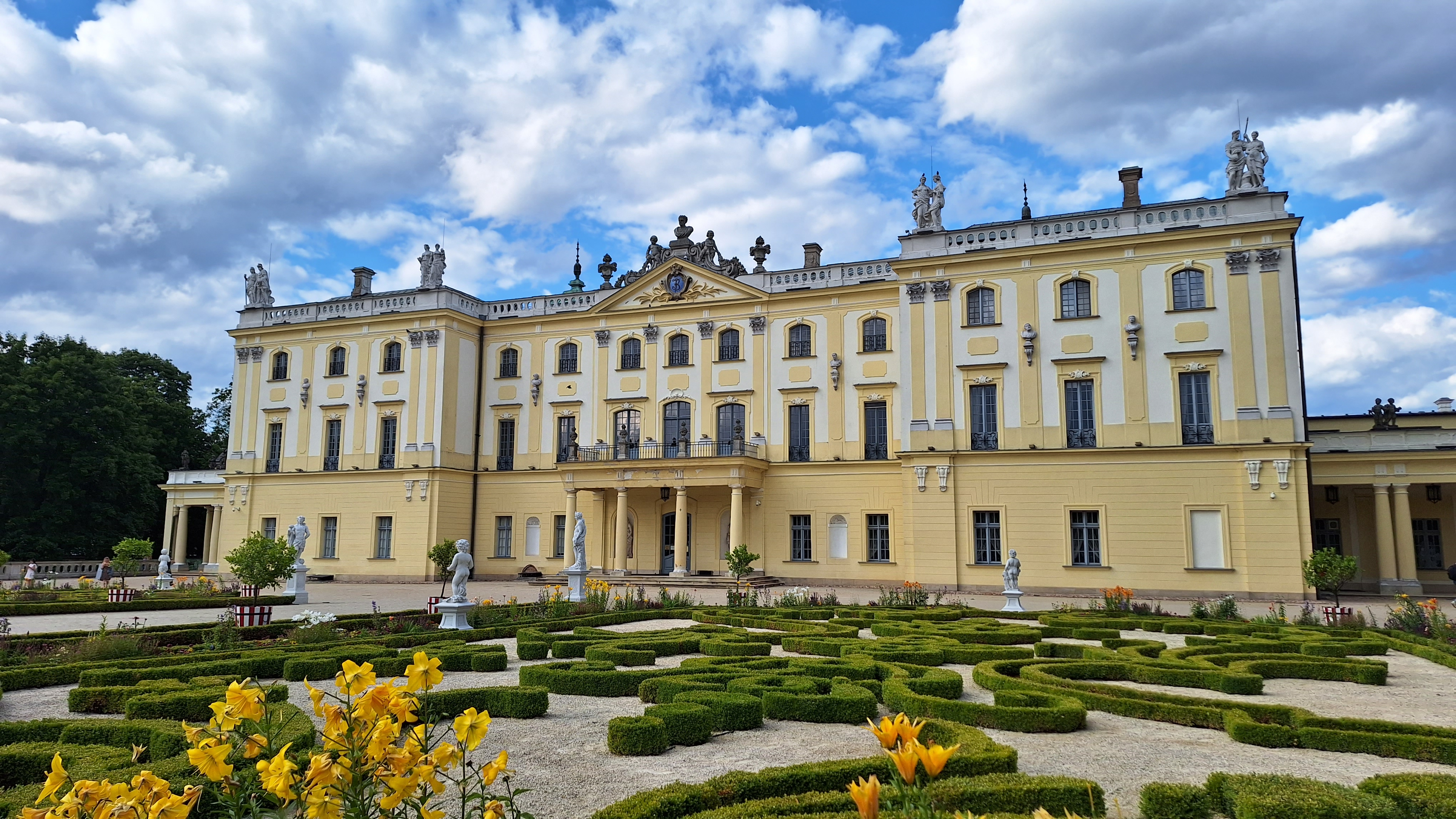
- View of the Branicki Palace gardens
- Interactive map of the Branicki Palace area

General information
- Architectural style: Baroque
- Location: Białystok, Poland
- Coordinates: 53°07′50″N 23°09′54″E
- Current tenants: Medical University of Białystok
- Construction started: 1691
- Completed: 1697
- Renovated: 1940s–1950s
- Demolished: 1944

Design and construction
- Architect: Tylman Gamerski

Branicki Palace (Polish: Pałac Branickich) is a historical edifice in Białystok, Poland. It was developed on the site of an earlier building in the first half of the 18th century by Jan Klemens Branicki, a wealthy Polish–Lithuanian Commonwealth hetman, into a residence suitable for a man whose ambition was to become king of Poland. The palace complex with gardens, pavilions, sculptures, outbuildings and other structures and the city with churches, city hall and monastery, all built almost at the same time according to French models was the reason why the city was known in the 18th century as Versailles de la Pologne (Versailles of Poland) and subsequently Versailles de la Podlachie (Versailles of Podlasie).

== History ==
The Palace was built for Count Jan Klemens Branicki, Great Crown Hetman and patron of art and science, raised in the French milieu of the Polish aristocracy, who transformed a previous house into the suitably magnificent residence of a great Polish noble, a rival to Wilanów Palace, making a start in 1726. He also laid out the central part of the town of Bialystok, not a large place in the 18th century, with its triangular market.

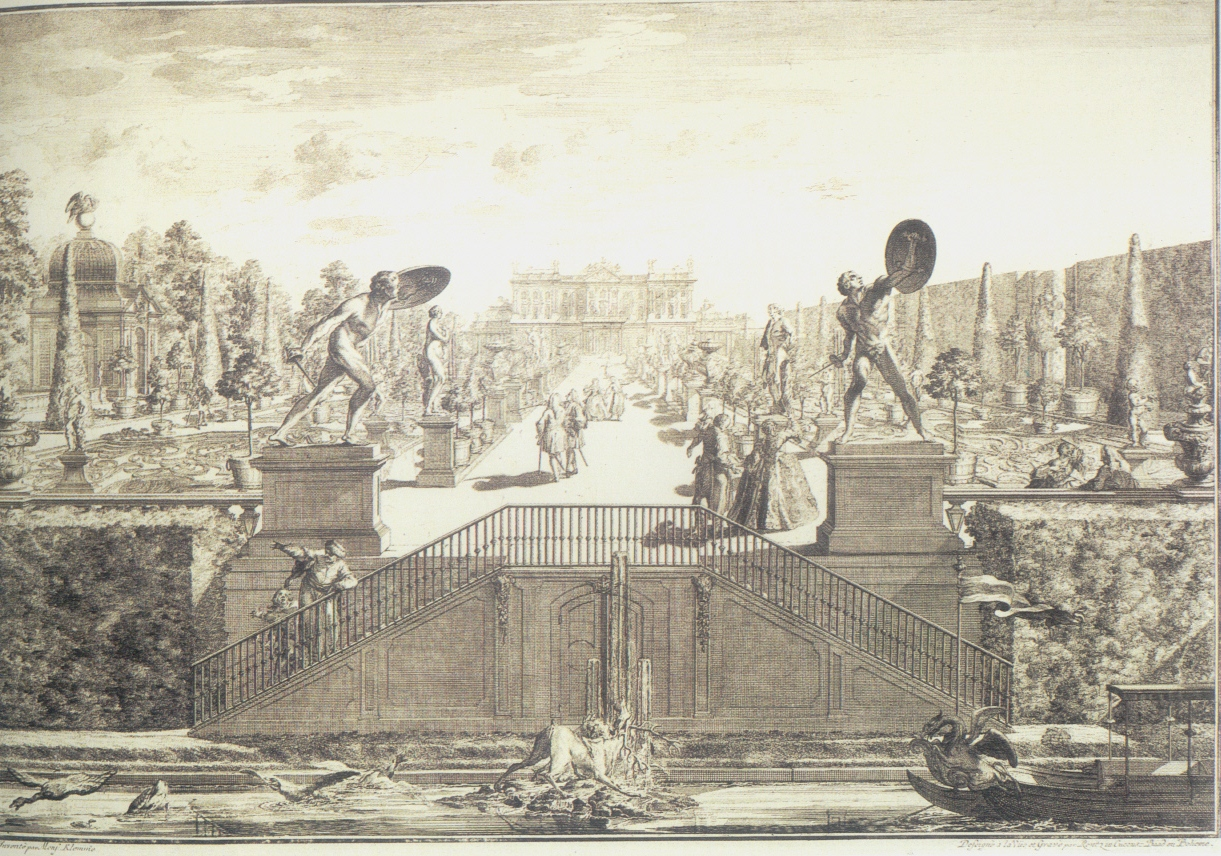
Illustration of the Branicki Palace (1752). View from today's Akademicka Street. At that time the palace was known as the Versailles of Poland.

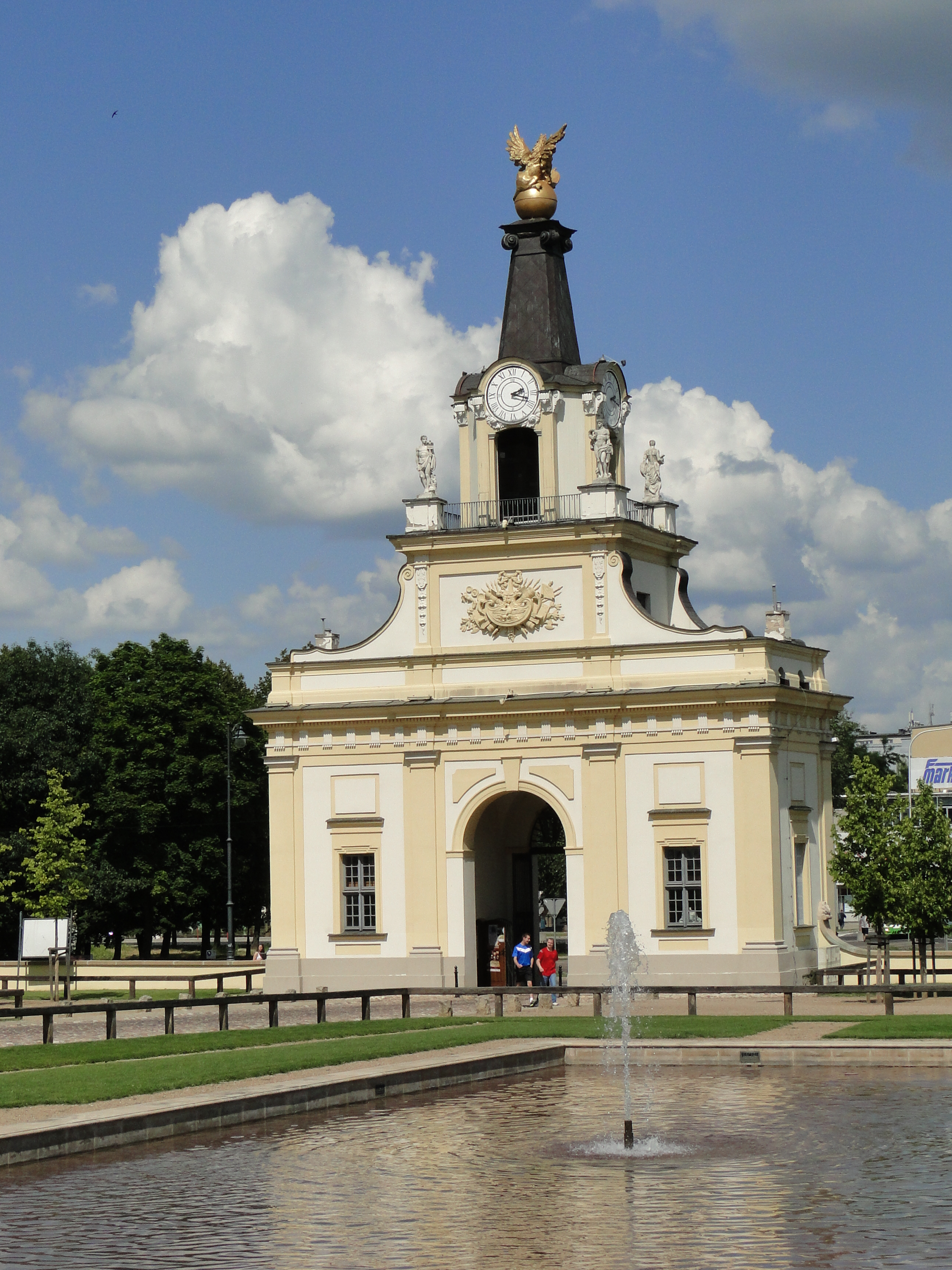
The main gate of the palace.

The original wooden manor of the Raczkowicz family that occupied the site was transformed in the 16th century into a brick two-storey castle for Piotr Wiesiołowski the Younger. The architect was Hiob Bretfus, who constructed the a gothic-renaissance structure with a moat and earth ramparts.

Shortly after the property was inherited by Stefan Mikołaj Branicki he commissioned the transformation of the castle into a baroque mansion. The structure was thoroughly reconstructed during 1691–1697 by Tylman Gamerski, including one of the towers adapted to a staircase. During the subsequent reconstruction, the side outbuildings were enhanced, the Ionic colonnade above the main entrance was erected and the whole structure was adorned with sculptures. Further expansion of the palace was conducted by Jan Klemens Branicki and his wife Izabella Poniatowska. Starting in 1728 the reconstruction of the palace was directed by Johann Sigmund Deybel. Under his supervision, the structure was enhanced, the tympanum and domes on the towers were added. Deybel is also the author of the main façade. The existing pavilions and outbuildings were merged with the main building (corps de logis) according to French model to form wings surrounding a horseshoe court - the courtyard of honour (cour d'honneur), which was closed with a gate built in 1758 by Jan Henryk Klemm.

Among notable architects employed in reconstruction was Pierre Ricaud de Tirregaille. After the death of Deybel, in the years 1750–1771, the rebuilding of the palace was supervised by Jakub Fontana, who was an author of the palace's vestibule, rococo interiors and the staircase with statues by Jan Chrysostom Redler (1754). The fence between the initial (avant cour) and honor courtyard was adorned in 1757 with two monumental sculptures by Redler - Hercules fighting the dragon and Hercules fighting the hydra. Interior decorations were conducted by artists such as Szymon Czechowicz, Ludwik Marteau, Augustyn Mirys, Jean-Baptiste Pillement, fresco painters such as Georg Wilhelm Neunhertz (in 1738) and Antoni Herliczka and stucco decorators Samuel Contesse and Antoni Vogt.

The newly created Versailles de la Pologne concentrated many great artists, poets including Elżbieta Drużbacka and Franciszek Karpiński and scientists. A theater, orchestra and ballet were established. Among notable guests were King Augustus II the Strong (1726 to 1727 and again in 1729), King Augustus III and his wife and sons Prince Francis Xavier and Prince Charles (1744 and 1752), Prince Charles of Saxony, Duke of Courland (twice in 1759), Bishop Ignacy Krasicki (1760), King Stanisław August Poniatowski (occasionally), Emperor Joseph II Habsburg (1780), Grand Duke Paul, future Tsar Paul I of Russia, with his wife (1782), King Louis XVIII of France (1798), French, English, Turkish and Russian envoys and Italian actress.

With the third Partition of Poland it went to the Prussian Kingdom and, after 1807, to Russia.

Before 1830, a significant part of the palace's furnishings was destroyed or taken away. After Izabela's death, the Potockis took most of the paintings and furniture to Choroszcz and their estates in Russia. They were completely destroyed. Part of the palace's furnishings were purchased by Tsar Alexander I, and some, including the garden sculptures, were taken to Saint Petersburg, where they decorated the Tsar's residences. The palace underwent occasional alterations and repairs. It almost lost its former significance. In 1837, the Institute of Noble Maidens was located here. In 1884, for the needs of the institute, styleless buildings were added to the palace. They irreversibly destroyed the former Baroque structure of the residence. After the Institute was evacuated to Moscow following the withdrawal of the Russians from the city, the Germans set up a military hospital in the palace in 1916. This led to further devastation. In 1919 following the city's inclusion in the newly established Second Polish Republic, the Polish military authorities had their seat there.

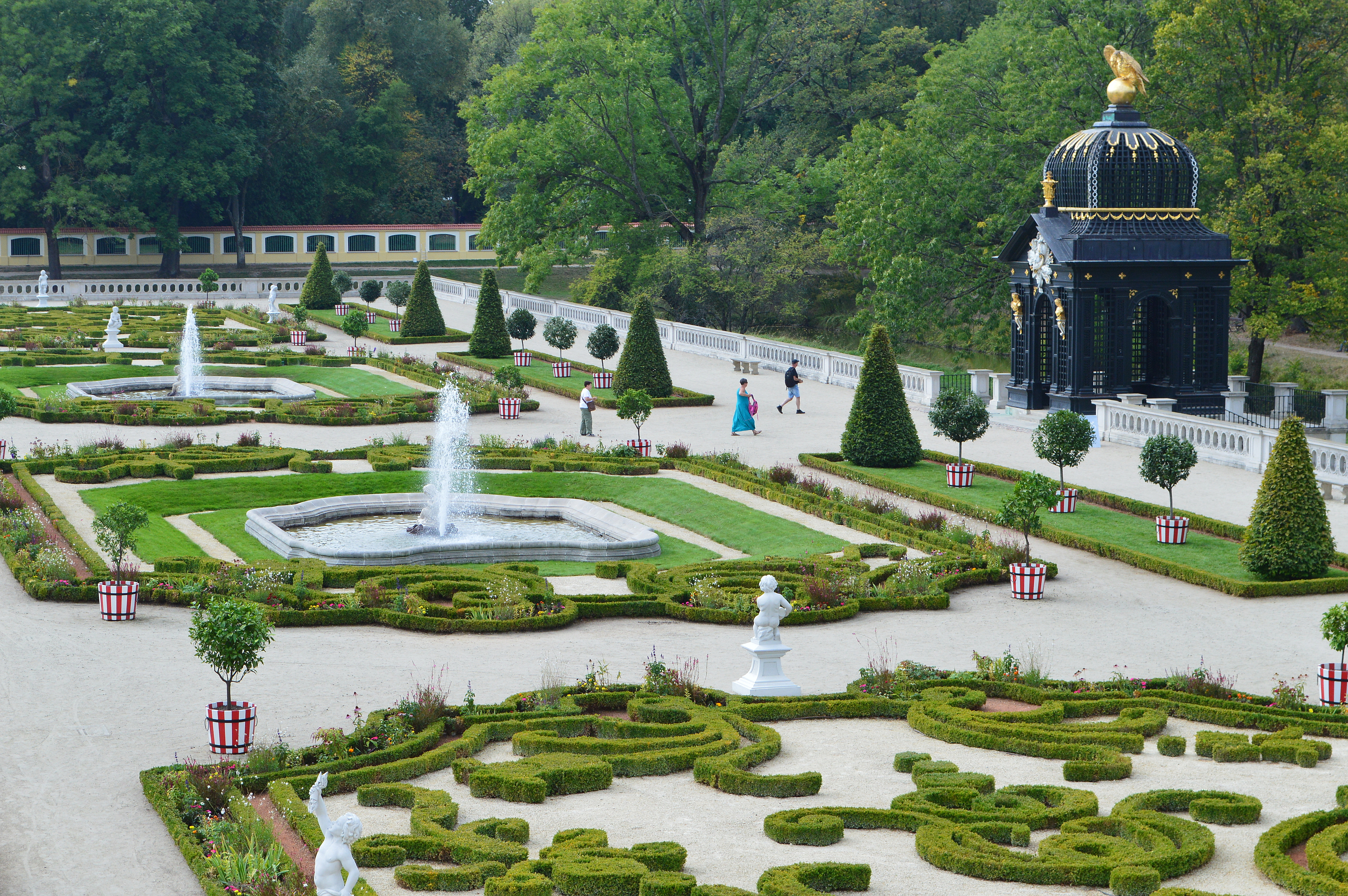
View of the garden in front of the palace

In the summer of 1920, during the Battle of Białystok, the palace served briefly as the headquarters of the Provisional Polish Revolutionary Committee. Branicki Palace suffered from bombing and fires caused by the Germans, with damage totaling approximately 70%. It was restored after World War II as a matter of national pride.

In the same year, following the end of the Polish–Soviet War and the return of the city to Polish hands, a decision was made to designate the palace as the seat of the Białystok Voivodeship Office. The rooms on the ground floor were designated as the governor's apartment. Other rooms in the palace housed offices. In the room on the first floor, which was created as a result of the reconstruction in 1879, ceremonies, balls, receptions and exhibitions were organized. In 1939, after the Germans occupied Białystok, representatives of the Wehrmacht and the Red Army signed documents sanctioning the fall of Poland in the palace. In 1941-1944, the German National Planning Office and the Office of the Civil Commissioner were located here.

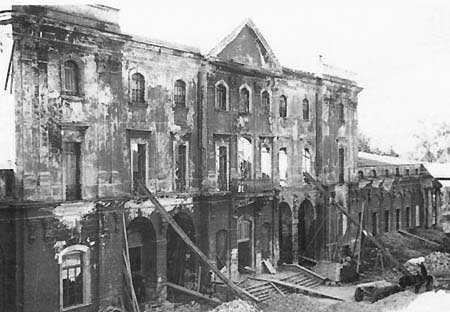
Branicki Palace destroyed by Germans in 1944

Following the joining of Białystok to Poland and the establishment of communist rule, in 1946 the Main Directorate of Museums and Monument Protection commissioned engineer Stanisław Bukowski to develop a project for the reconstruction and adaptation of the monument to the Palace of Folk Culture in the main building and the Regional Museum in one of the side wings. Based on the comments of the then General Conservator of Monuments, Prof. Jan Zachowatowicz, and on the basis of his own research and that of Dr. Jan Glinka, Bukowski prepared a technical project for the reconstruction of the palace in the years 1947-1949. At the same time, he was appointed to the position of the main director of the reconstruction. The main conservation assumption of the project was to rebuild the palace and restore the monument's external appearance, together with the architectural decoration from the mid-18th century.

At the end of 1949, the decision regarding its purpose was changed and the first university in the history of Białystok - the Medical Academy - was located there. Andrzej Nitch who replaced Bukowski as chief architect of those efforts, created the project of adaptation for the purposes of the Medical Academy, developed in 1950. It introduced a number of changes despite Bukowski's reservations. However, in 1951 Bukowski he was once again appointed to the position of architectural director of the palace reconstruction on behalf of the Medical Academy. By 1955, the complex of buildings had been almost completely rebuilt and adapted to the needs of the university. In the 1950s, the project of revalorization of the palace garden complex was also started. The designs for the historic park were prepared by Prof. Gerard Ciołek, and Bukowski for the park pavilions, terrace, fountains and bridge. As late as the 1970’s, Bukowski supervised the execution of the polychromes in the main hall and the staircase of the palace.

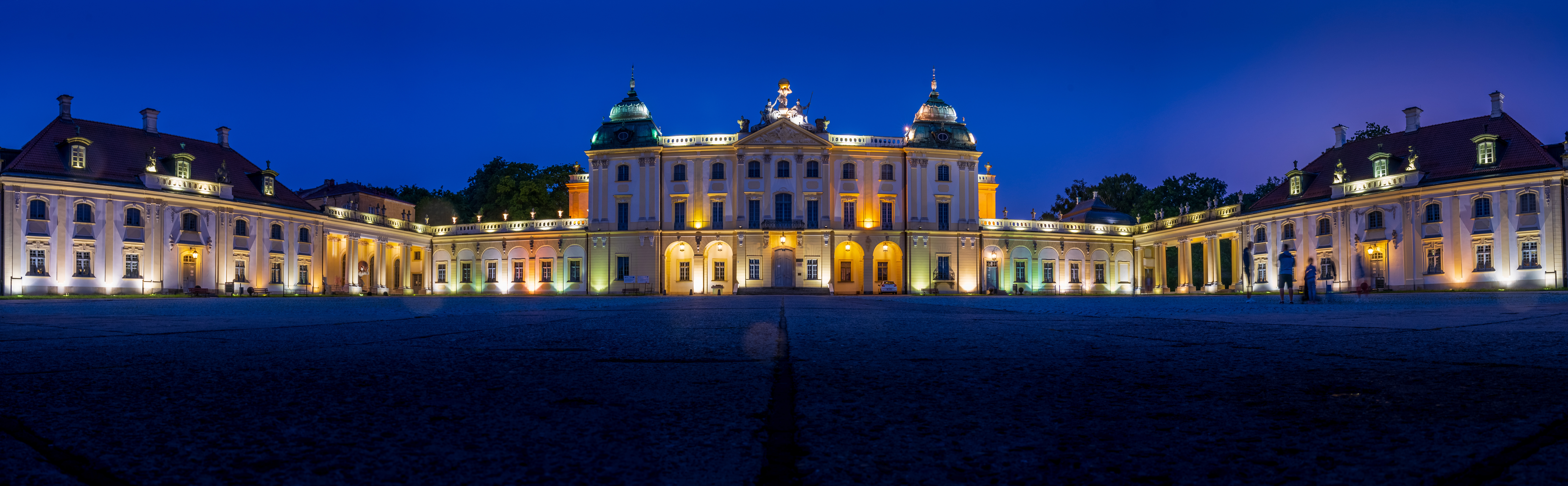
The front of Branicki Palace at night

== The palace grounds ==
A straight avenue centred on the palace passes across the river on a three-arched bridge across the river, which is confined with deep stone embankment walling, to the large enclosed paved forecourt. The central block has two storeys upon a high arcaded basement storey, with a pedimented central block displaying Branicki's coat-of-arms and end pavilions that have squared domes in two tiers. The roofline is an Italianate balustrade that masks a low attic storey, and the heroic sculptural group of Atlas crowning all.

Surrounding the Palace are the grounds. The garden front has a terrace raised on columns, which forms a podium for viewing the parterre in the French taste with a main central allée and French sphinxes, and a later English landscape garden, in the naturalistic taste associated with the English park, surrounding the grounds. The central axis continues to a guest pavilion. Other outbuildings include the Arsenal (1755), Orangery and Italian and Tuscan Pavilions.

== Gallery ==
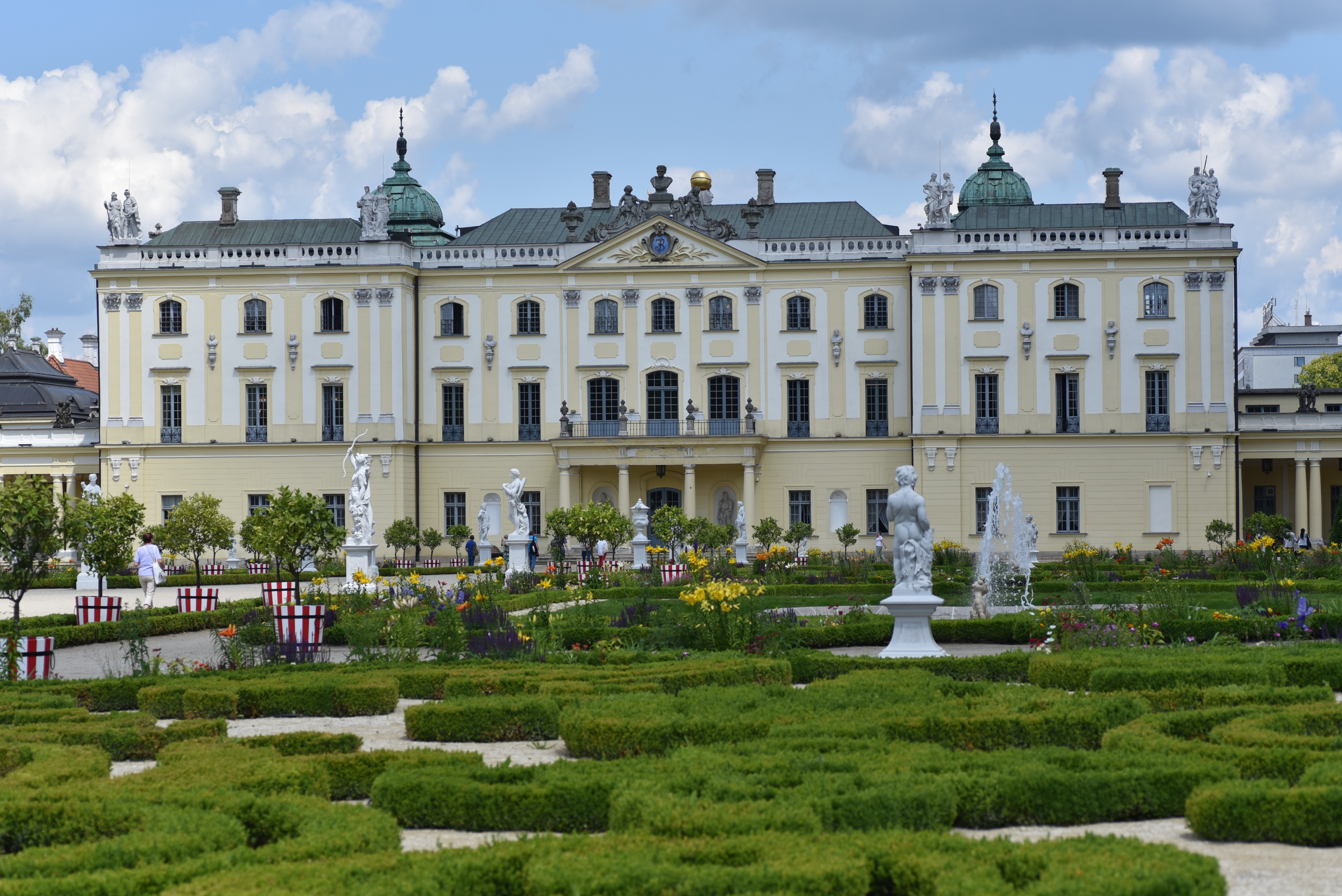
Front view

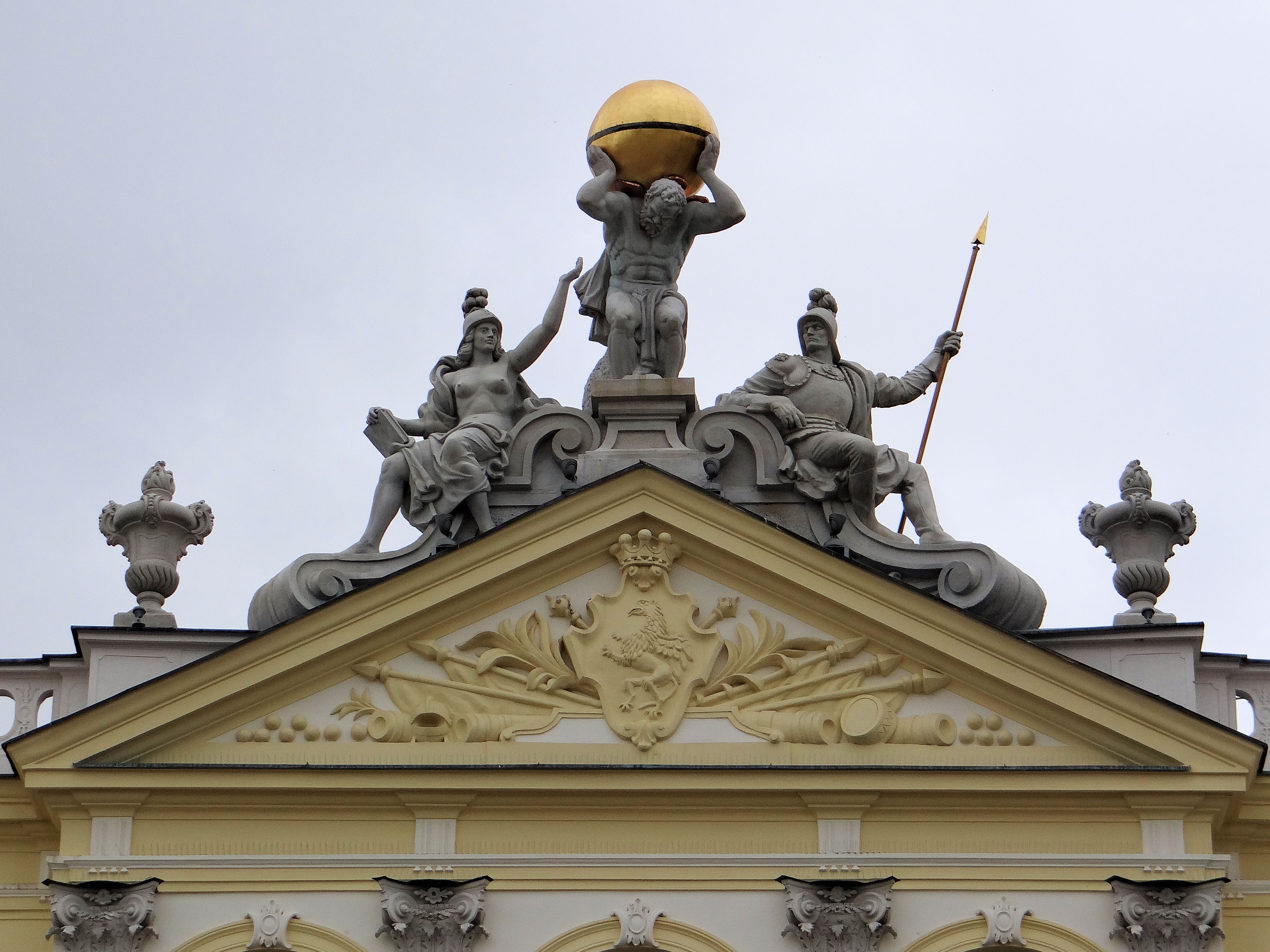
The tympanum of the Branicki Palace in Białystok.

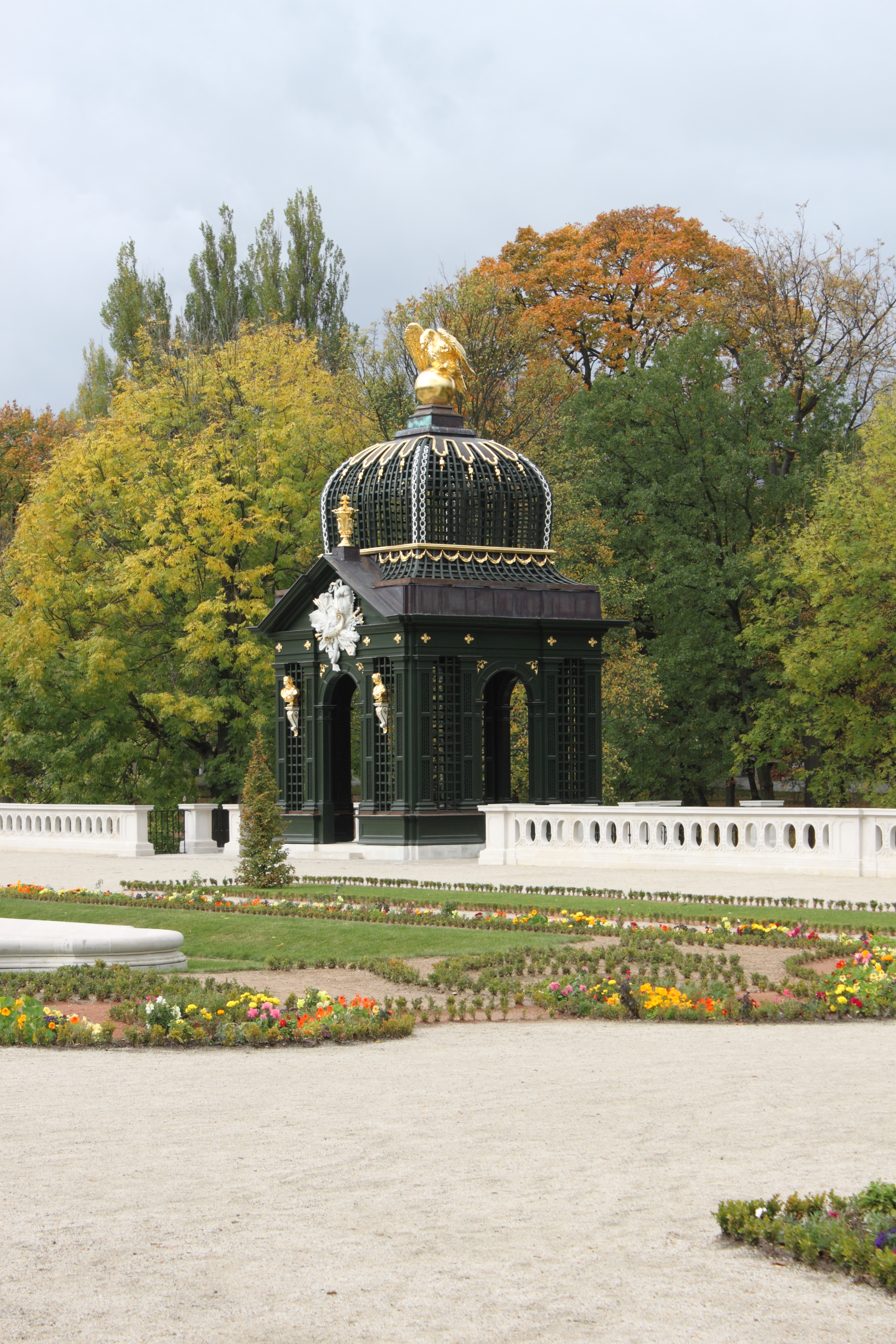
A trellised gazebo in the garden.

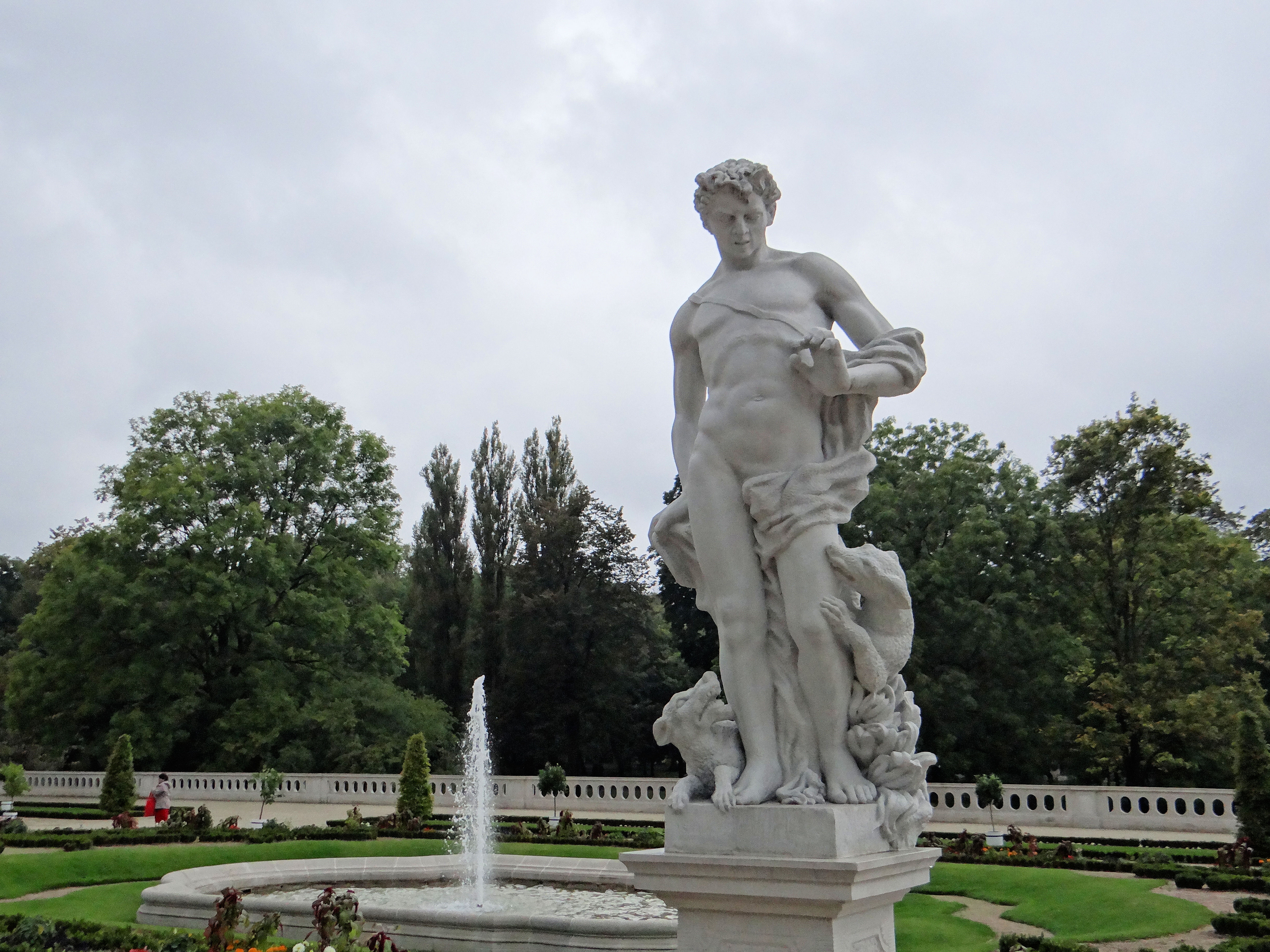
The sculpture of Actaeon in the palace garden.

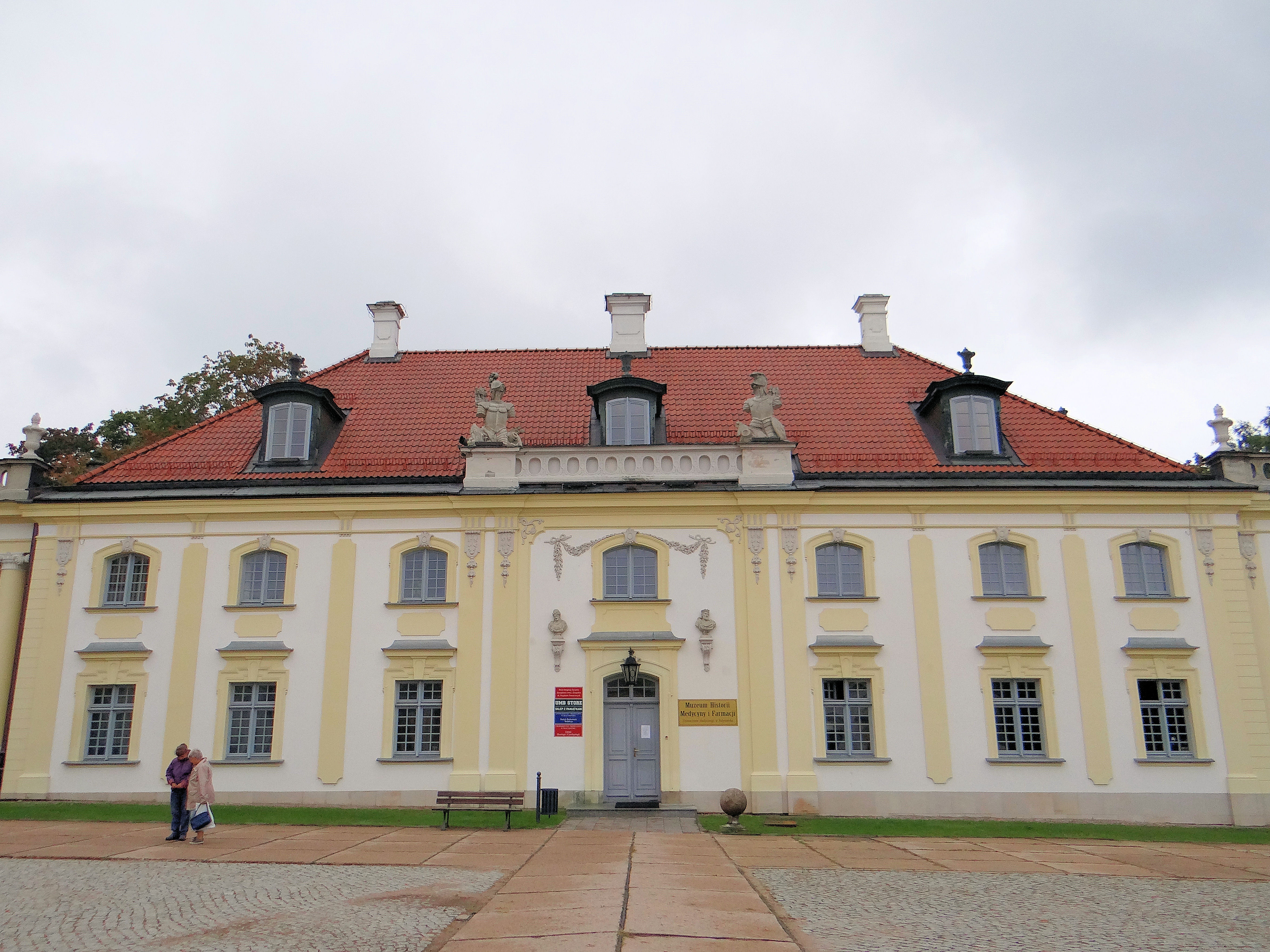
The palace museum.

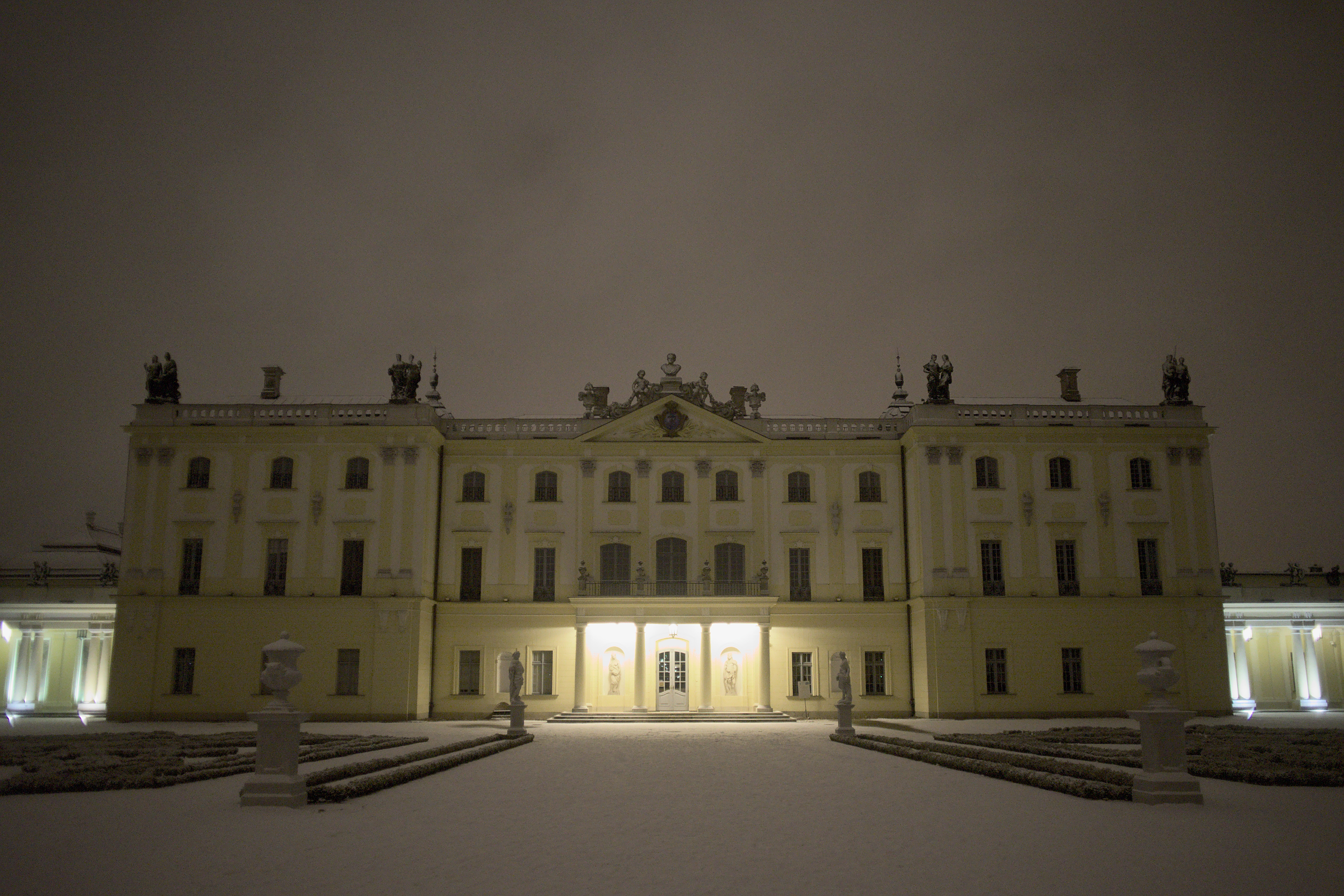
Palace during nighttime.

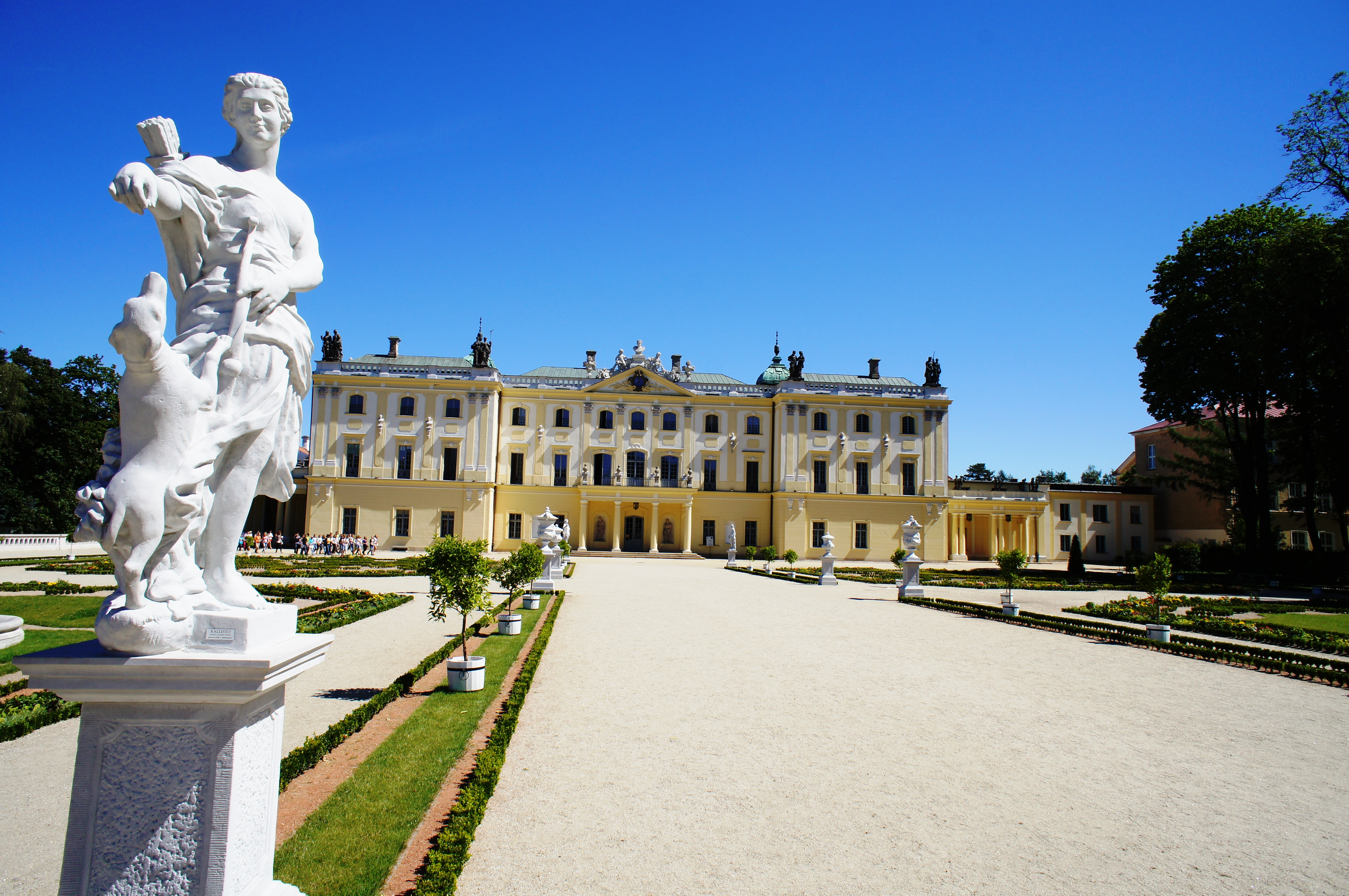
Garden elevation of Branicki Palace

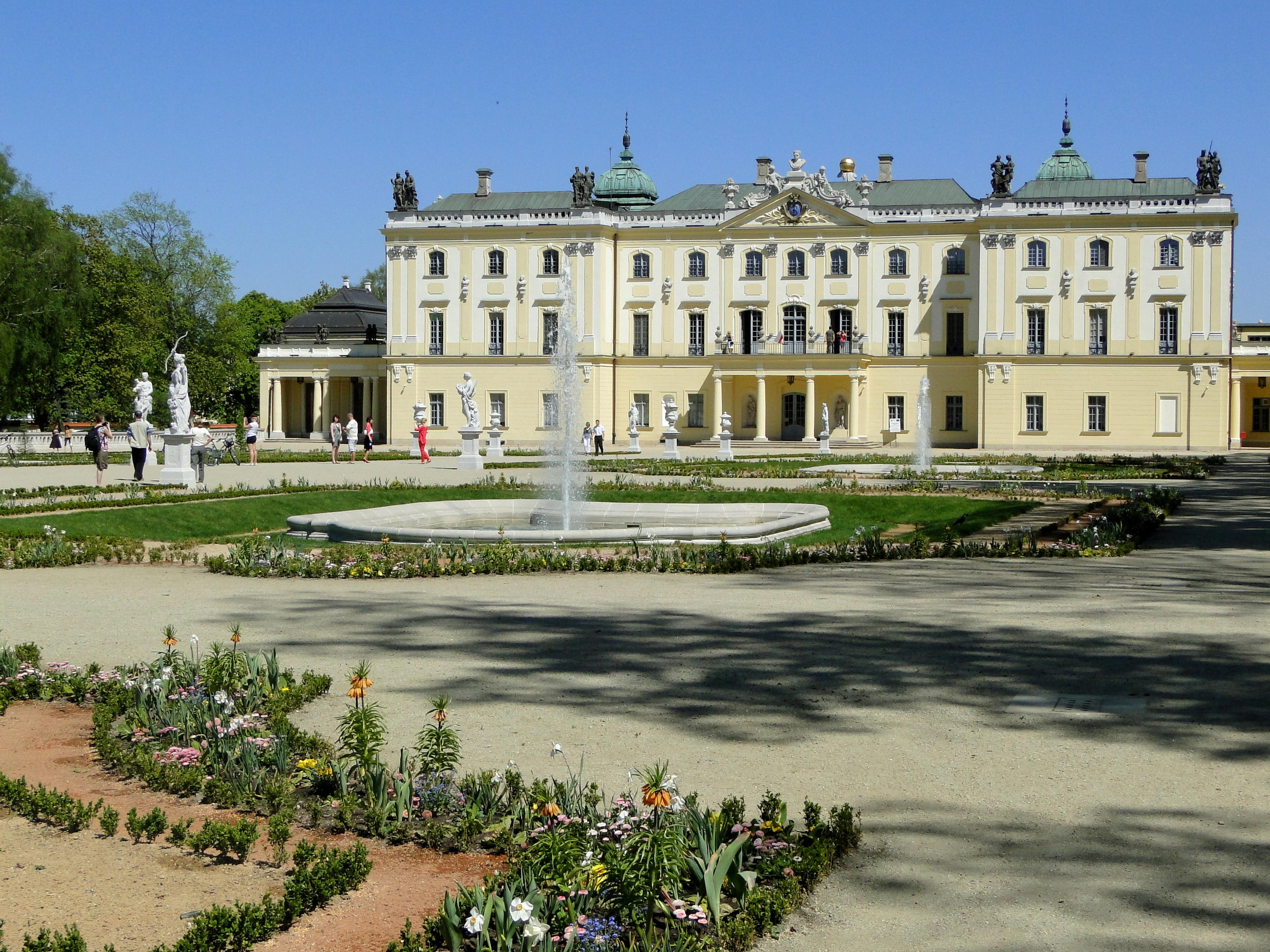
A fountain in the Palace Garden.

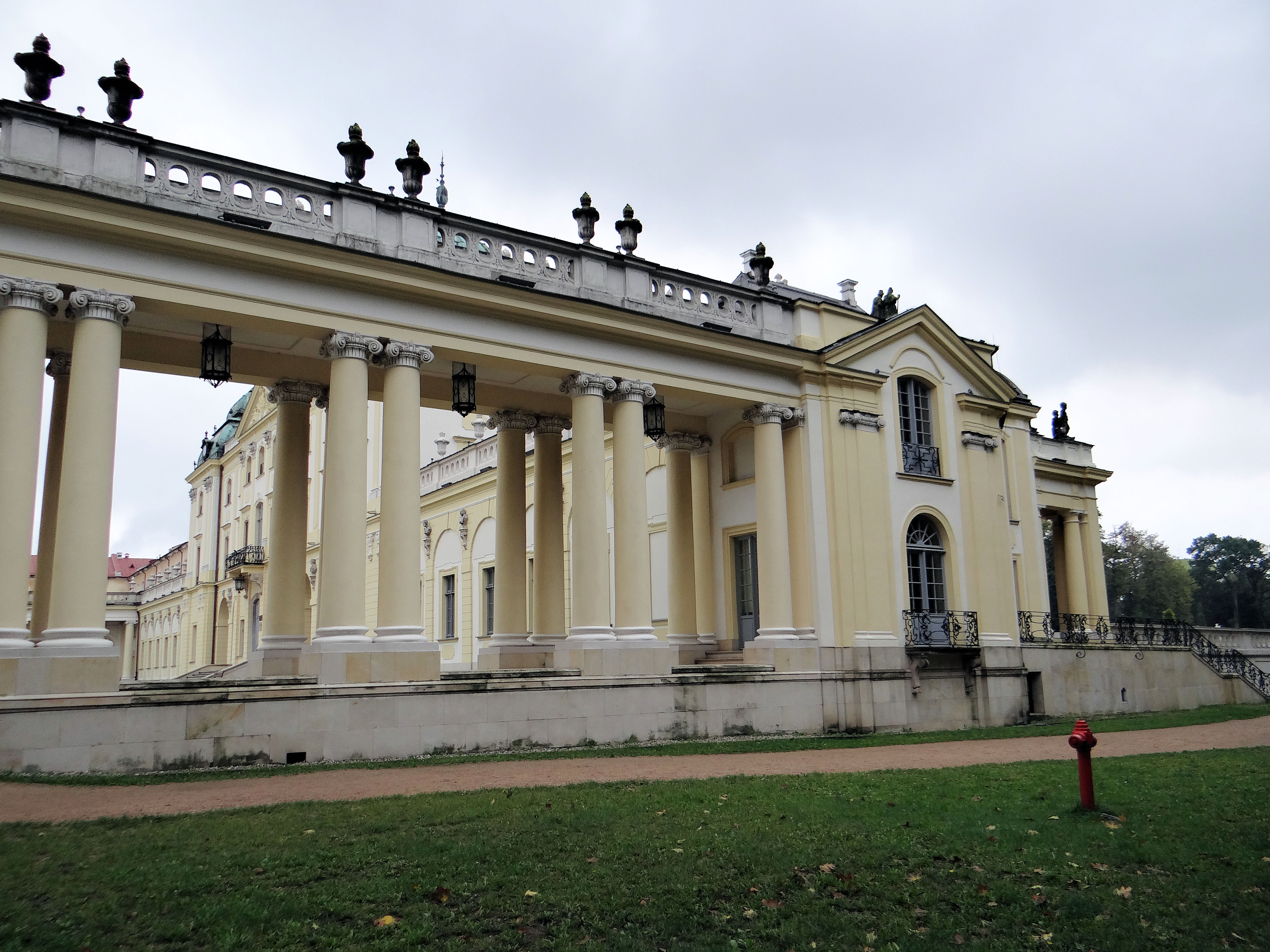
Colonnades of the Branicki Palace.

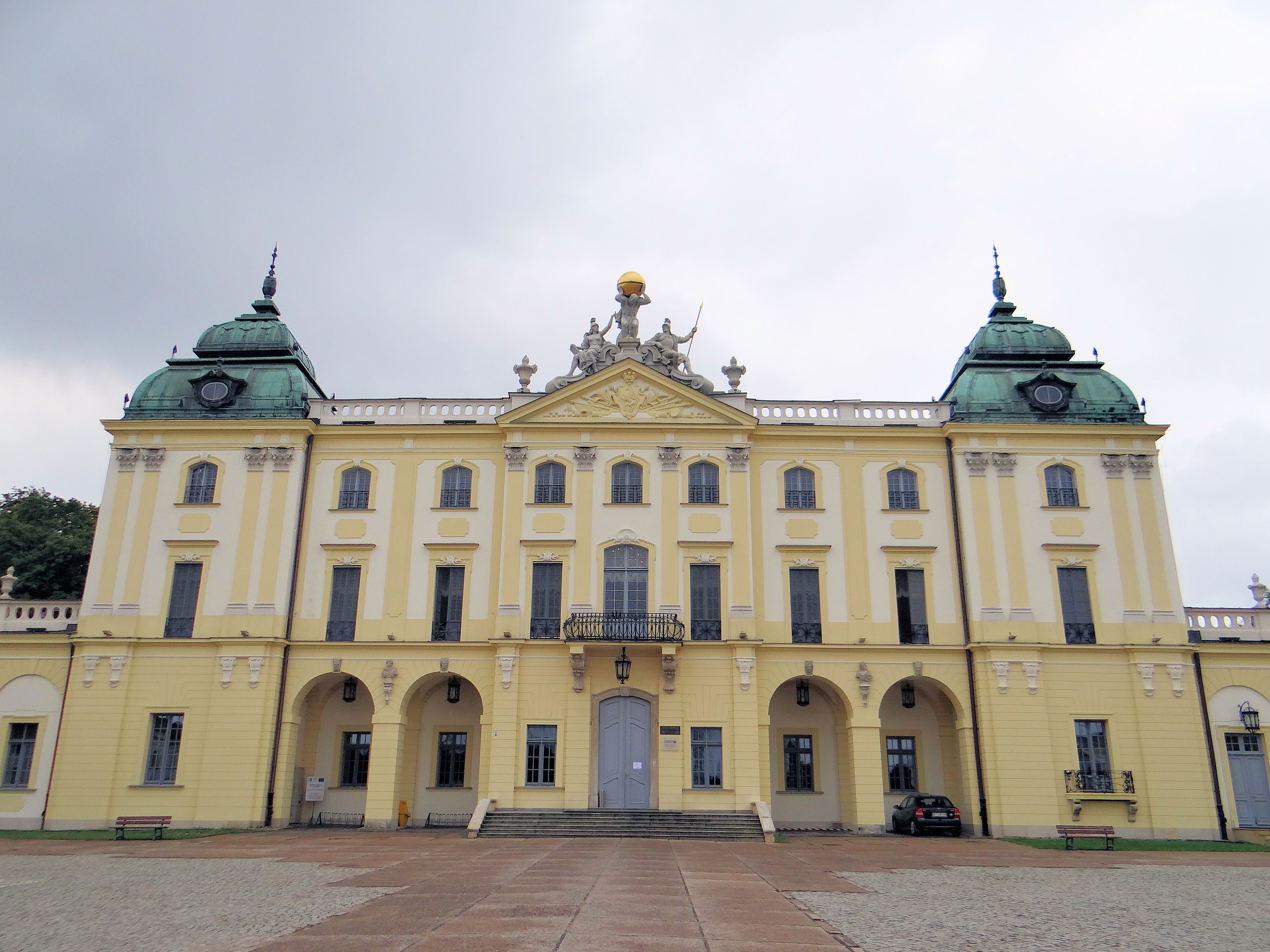
Corps de logis of the Branicki Palace

== See also ==
- List of Baroque residences
- Branicki Palace, Warsaw
