= Izabela Płaneta-Małecka =

Polish politician

Minister of Health of the Polish People's Republic
- In office 14 October 1988 – 1 August 1989
- Prime Minister: Mieczysław Rakowski
- Preceded by: Janusz Komender
- Succeeded by: Andrzej Kosiniak-Kamysz

Personal details
- Born: 8 December 1930 Lwow
- Died: 17 December 2016 (aged 86) Łódź, Poland
- Party: Independent
- Education: Medical Academy of Łódź
- Occupation: Physician, politician

Izabela Płaneta-Małecka (8 December 1930 – 17 December 2016) was a Polish physician, university professor and pediatrician who served as the Minister of Health in the Polish People's Republic. She was a long-time researcher and lecturer at the Military Medical Academy and also a deputy and a member of the Polish Women's League. She won the Cross of Merit (Poland) and was a member of the World Peace Council from 1983.

== Biography ==
Daughter of Jan and Zofia, she was born in Lwów (then part of the Second Polish Republic). Her father and her brother died when she was young. After the war she moved from Lwów (Ukraine) to Piotrków Trybunalski (Poland). In medical college, she met her future husband Ignacy Małecki to whom she was married for over 60 years. She founded the first clinic in Poland for children with gastrointestinal diseases. She worked at the Hospital for Infection Bieganski in Łódź. In 1954 she graduated from the Medical Academy of Łódź. From 1960 to 1982, she was employed as a doctor and assistant professor at the Department of Children's Diseases of the Military Medical Academy. From 1979 she was a professor of medical sciences, and from 1985, professor at the Military Medical Academy. She was the author of over 600 works in the field of paediatrics. In 1980, she became the head of the 2nd Clinic of Lung Diseases of the Military Medical Academy, established on the basis of the Hospital of Lung Diseases in Łódź. She was the creator and implementer of the concept of multifocal care for a chronically ill child (hospital – clinic – health camp). As part of this activity, for over 20 years she co-organized health camps with for diabetology and gastrology treatment. She was also a co-organizer of two sanatoriums for children with diabetes, in Rabka and Kołobrzeg. In 1983, she became a member of the National Council of the Patriotic Movement for National Rebirth. * In March 1988, she defended her doctoral dissertation, The distant assessment of the effects of acute pancreatitis in the light of functional and imaging studies of this organ. From 14 October 1988, to 1 August 1989, she was the Minister of Health and Social Welfare in the government of Mieczysław Rakowski. On 22 December 1988, she signed an order formally establishing the University Children Clinical Hospital in Białystok. In 1989-1990 she was also the director of paediatrics at the Institute of Pediatrics. She worked at the institute "Polish Mother's Health Center" in Łódź as a consultant at the gastroenterology clinic and a member of the Scientific Council of the institute. On 26 May 1997 she obtained her habilitation on the basis of the work entitled Research on the participation of epidermal growth factor (EGF), transforming growth factor and their receptor in intestinal carcinogenesis thick. On 12 June 2002, she was awarded the title of professor in medical sciences. She was employed as an associate professor and head of the Department of Gastroenterology and Nephrology at the Medical University of Lodz. She was appointed full professor at the Department of Gastroenterology of the Institute of Polish Mother's Health Center, and at the Department of Gastroenterology at the Medical University of Lodz. She died in 2016 in Lodz and was buried at the Radogoszcz in the city.

== Scientific research ==
The implementer of many scientific and research projects, and initiator of the introduction of a number of the latest research and cognitive techniques, she was author and co-author of over 600 scientific publications in national and foreign journals. The results of her scientific and clinical studies significantly contributed to the development of gastroenterology and the introduction of gastrointestinal endoscopy in children and adolescents. Supervisor of habilitation theses and supervisor of over 40 doctoral dissertations. Head of specialization in pediatrics and gastroenterology for over 50 doctors. The organizer of scientific conferences. Initiator and coordinator of cooperation with many research and clinical centers in Poland and abroad. Creator and implementer of the concept of multifocal care for a chronically ill child (clinic - clinic - health camp), including the first gastroenterological clinic for children in the country. Co-organizer of 2 sanatoriums in Rabka and Kołobrzeg for children with diabetes, and over 20 years organizer of health camps with a gastrological and pulmonary profile. Her daughter is prof. Ewa Małecka-Panas. Her husband was Ignacy Małecki. She was buried on 22 December 2016 at the cemetery of St. Roch in Lodz Radogoszcz.

== See also ==
- Alina Margolis-Edelman
