= Jakub Chlebowski =

Polish Jewish professor and doctor

Jakub Chlebowski or Jakob Chlebowski, born Jakob Frydman (3 May 1905 in Liwenhof, Russian Empire – 25 January 1969 in Israel) was a Polish Jewish professor and doctor, who was Chancellor and Vice-Chancellor of the Medical Academy in Bialystok, Poland (now the Medical University of Białystok).

== Life and career ==
Chlebowski received an honorary degree from the University of Montpellier in France. He was the author of dozens of scientific and research papers in French, German and Polish, and three ground-breaking medical textbooks. He graduated from the University of Vilnius in 1929. In the 1930s Frydman worked at the Department of Internal Diseases in Vilnius. During World War II he was arrested by the Soviets and exiled to the depths of the Soviet Union. There, in Komi Republic and Krasnoyarsk Krai, as a prisoner, he worked as a doctor treating other prisoners despite the poorest conditions and with few supplies, earning the respect of senior Soviet officers. He also served as chairman of the Union of Polish Patriots in Krasnoyarsk. Frydman returned to Poland in 1945 following the war and decided to change his surname to Chlebowski.

After the war Chlebowski was employed by the Clinic of Internal Diseases in Kraków and Łódź, and defended his dissertation in Łódź in 1948.

In 1951 Chlebowski became involved in the founding of the Medical University of Białystok and was appointed Professor of Medicine and Director of the Department of Internal Diseases. Between 1957 and 1959 Chlebowski held the post of Vice-Rector of the Medical Academy in Białystok, and between 1959 and 1962 he was appointed as rector.

Chlebowski was removed from the university during "1968 Polish political crisis" on 22 April 1968 at an openly held party gathering, attended by all university staff and students. The documentation from the Medical Academy in Bialystok (the college PZPR letter dated 23 April 1968) reads: "The Committee Campus Polish United Workers' Party of the Academy of Medicine in Bialystok, after consideration of the matter on 22 April 1968, seek a request to the National Minister of Health, by his Magnificent Rector of the local university professor on the appeal of Jakub Chlebowski, the position of Head of the Department of Internal Diseases of the Medical Academy in Bialystok, because of his hostile attitude of the People's Republic of Poland and the Soviet Union."

On 16 October 1968 Chlebowski and his family (wife Tamar Chlebowski, a dentist, and his 21 years old daughter, Irena) emigrated to Israel. On 25 January 1969, Chlebowski was hit by a motorist whilst crossing the street.

=== Posthumous honors ===
In 1990 the Medical Academy in Białystok and various authorities honored the memory of Chlebowski and rectified their actions of 1968. The University senate unanimously adopted a resolution condemning the decision to remove Chlebowski from the university.

A lecture hall at the State Hospital has been named Clinical Professor. Dr. Jacob Chlebowskiego, and a bronze plaque has been placed commemorating the great patron.

In 1996, the Medical Academy in Białystok held a solemn meeting at the Białostockiego Department of Internal Polish Society to honor their great professor.

Chlebowski was awarded The Order Odrodzenia Polski (Order of Poland Reborn), one of Poland's highest civilian orders, conferred for outstanding achievements in the fields of education, science, sport, culture, and arts.

In 2005, to honor the centenary of Chlebowski's birth, the Academy of Medicine in Białystok awarded its first, and now annual, prize, in honor of Chlebowski, to the top medical graduate student at the Medical Academy in Białystok. This prize was founded and is sponsored by Chlebowski's daughter, Dr. Irena Chlebowska-Bennett, an eye specialist who now lives in Sydney, Australia with her husband and two sons. The first laureate was Magdalena Mlonek, dentist, who was handed her prize in person by Dr. Irena Chlebowska-Bennett on campus during a ceremony held on 25 November 2005 in high Auli Medical University of Białystok.

Polonia Restituta has described Chlebowski as "an institution whose principles are now tended by large numbers of his colleagues and students". "He came to Bialystok in 1951, young and quickly took over the management of the Academy of Medical Clinic - Interior Diseases. His long and hard day [began] primarily as lecturer and moved to research and clinical practice. The Professor had a great ability to teach complex medical principles, which he later elevated to a higher level of complex medical findings, including through scientific work" said Professor Jan Stasiewicz. Professor Stasiewicz goes on to say "short descriptions and memories alone cannot reflect all the achievements, merits and successes the Professor and Chancellor of the Academy of Medical Sciences had; there were simply too many. The most important, that even today his disciples and students often say: "Explore, as Chlebowski [did]" or "if you fail to treat your patient as Chlebowski would have, you have no chance to successfully treat them", and most notable, "Chlebowski's medical ethics were not just slogans, they were simply his principle way of working".

== Selected bibliography ==
- The application of Perkal's discriminating function to differential diagnosis
- Some aspects of the carbohydrate metabolism in the obese (Pol Arch Med Wewn. 1969;42(3):355-8)
- Heparin and protease inhibitors in the prevention of experimental acute pancreatic necrosis in dogs (Digestion. 1969;2(1):7-16)
- Influence of insulin and vasopressin on potassium distribution in tissues (Journ Annu Diabetol Hotel Dieu. 1968;9:133-7. French)
- Influence of insulin and vasopressin on sodium distribution in tissues (Journ Annu Diabetol Hotel Dieu. 1968;9:125-31. French)
- Studies on sigmoid colon activity in diabetes and hyperthyroidism (Pol Med Sci Hist Bull. 1968 Jan;11(1):34-7)
- Mathematical discrimination of glycemic curves in obesity, hypertension and myocardial infarction (Pol Med J. 1968;7(4):817-24)
- Studies on the effect of insulin on the cell membrane of blood cells (Wiad Lek. 1968 Jan 1;21(1):29-33. Polish)
- Principles of dietetic treatment of diabetes according to physiopathologic data (Wiad Lek. 1968 Jan 1;21(1):29-33. Polish)
- Sigmography and its application in various endocrine disorders (J Med Bord. 1967 May;144(5):685-96. French)
- Mathematical evaluation of glycemic curves after chlorothiazide administration (Pol Arch Med Wewn. 1967;39(2):219-27. Polish)
- Effect of insulin and other hormones on penetration of cobalt ion and vitamin B 12 into liver cells (Pol Arch Med Wewn. 1967;39(2):175-80. Polish)
- Mathematical discrimination of glycemic curves in obesity, hypertension and myocardial infarction (Pol Arch Med Wewn. 1967;39(2):143-50. Polish)
- Studies on the effect of insulin on the cellular membranes of the morphologic elements of blood (Pol Arch Med Wewn. 1967;39(2):139-42. Polish)
- Sigmographic studies in certain endocrine diseases (Pol Arch Med Wewn. 1967;39(2):131-7. Polish)
- Sigmographic studies in diabetic enteropathies and blood sugar variations (Wien Z Inn Med. 1967;48(9):348-52. German)
- 15th anniversary of the II Clinic of Internal Diseases of the Medical Academy in Białystok (Pol Arch Med Wewn. 1967;39(2):113-6. Polish)
- Trial of Sjögren's syndrome treatment with arechin (Resochin) (Pol Tyg Lek. 1966 Jun 27;21(26):997-8. Polish)
- Studies on diabetic enteropathy (Pol Arch Med Wewn. 1966;37(3):263-6. Polish)
- Enteropathia diabetica (Pol Arch Med Wewn. 1966;37(3):253-6. Review. Polish)
- ATYPICAL DIABETIC COMA. 2 CASE REPORTS (Wiad Lek. 1965 Mar 1;18:425-7. Polish)
- PATHOGENESIS OF PULMONARY EMPHYSEMA (Pol Arch Med Wewn. 1964;34:1401-3. Polish)
- EXCRETION OF UROPEPSIN AND 17-KETOSTEROIDS IN PATIENTS WITH RESPIRATORY INSUFFICIENCY (Pol Arch Med Wewn. 1963;33:863-8. Polish)
- CASE OF WALDENSTROM'S MACROGLOBULINEMIA. CONTRIBUTION TO THE STUDY OF PARAGLOBULINEMIA (Pol Arch Med Wewn. 1963;33:407-12. Polish)
- Effect of action of insulin on oscillometric changes (Pol Tyg Lek (Wars). 1957 Jun 24;12(26):999-1000. Polish)
- Attempted clarification of pathogenesis and hazards of peptic ulcer in circulatory insufficiency (Pol Tyg Lek (Wars). 1957 May 13;12(20):762-4. Polish)
- Primary erythroblastosis (Pol Arch Med Wewn. 1957;27(4):533-40. Polish)
- Clinical diagnosis of intestinal infarction (Pol Tyg Lek (Wars). 1956 Oct 15;11(42):1799-802. Polish)
- Method of quantitative determination of ketone bodies in urine applicable in clinical practice (Pol Arch Med Wewn. 1956;26(7):1119-20. Polish)
- Clinical importance of the division of lung abscesses into acute and chronic (Przegl Lek. 1955 Jun 24;11(6):161-3. Polish)
- Moniliasis (Przegl Lek. 1955;11(7):198-201. Polish)
- About Adverse cardiovascular diseases, with a manual (1953)
- Basic knowledge of nutrition, a manual (1952)
- Outline of education of the diseases of internal manual (1956)
