= Central Clinical Hospital of the Medical University in Łódź =

Coordinates: 51.7727°N 19.5089°E

The Central Clinical Hospital of the Medical University in Łódź is affiliated to the Medical University of Łódź. The building is on Sporna Street in Łódź.

It was established in 1997 and given its present name in 2015. It provides specialized dental services, round-the-clock and outpatient psychiatric care for adults and adolescents, Nuclear medicine, Preventive Medicine, Sports medicine, Cardiac Rehabilitation, Metabolic Diseases, Immunology, Allergology, Neurology and Genetics. It also performs hospital care, with 186 inpatient beds and 56 outpatient beds in the psychiatric departments. It includes the Central Teaching Hospital Institute of Dentistry which was created in 2012. The Maria Konopnicka Paediatric Centre has 19 departments (surgical and nonsurgical) with 260 inpatients and 6 outpatient beds.

It was awarded 51,620,000 Polish złoty for the second stage of the construction of the Clinical and Didactic Center of the Medical University of Lodz together with the Academic Oncology Center in 2019.

Monika Domarecka is the director of the hospital.
