= Janusz Komender =

Polish politician (1931–2024)

Minister of Health and Welfare
- In office 24 October 1987 – 14 October 1988
- Preceded by: Mirosław Cybulko
- Succeeded by: Izabela Płaneta-Małecka

Personal details
- Born: 24 March 1931 Piastów, Poland
- Died: 17 March 2024 (aged 92)
- Party: Independent
- Education: Medical University of Warsaw
- Occupation: Doctor

Janusz Komender (24 March 1931 – 17 March 2024) was a Polish doctor and politician. An independent, he served as Minister of Health and Welfare from 1987 to 1988.

Komender died on 17 March 2024, at the age of 92.
