= Medical University of Białystok =

Public university in Białystok, Poland

Coordinates: 53°7′49″N 23°9′57″E

- Uniwersytet Medyczny w Białymstoku
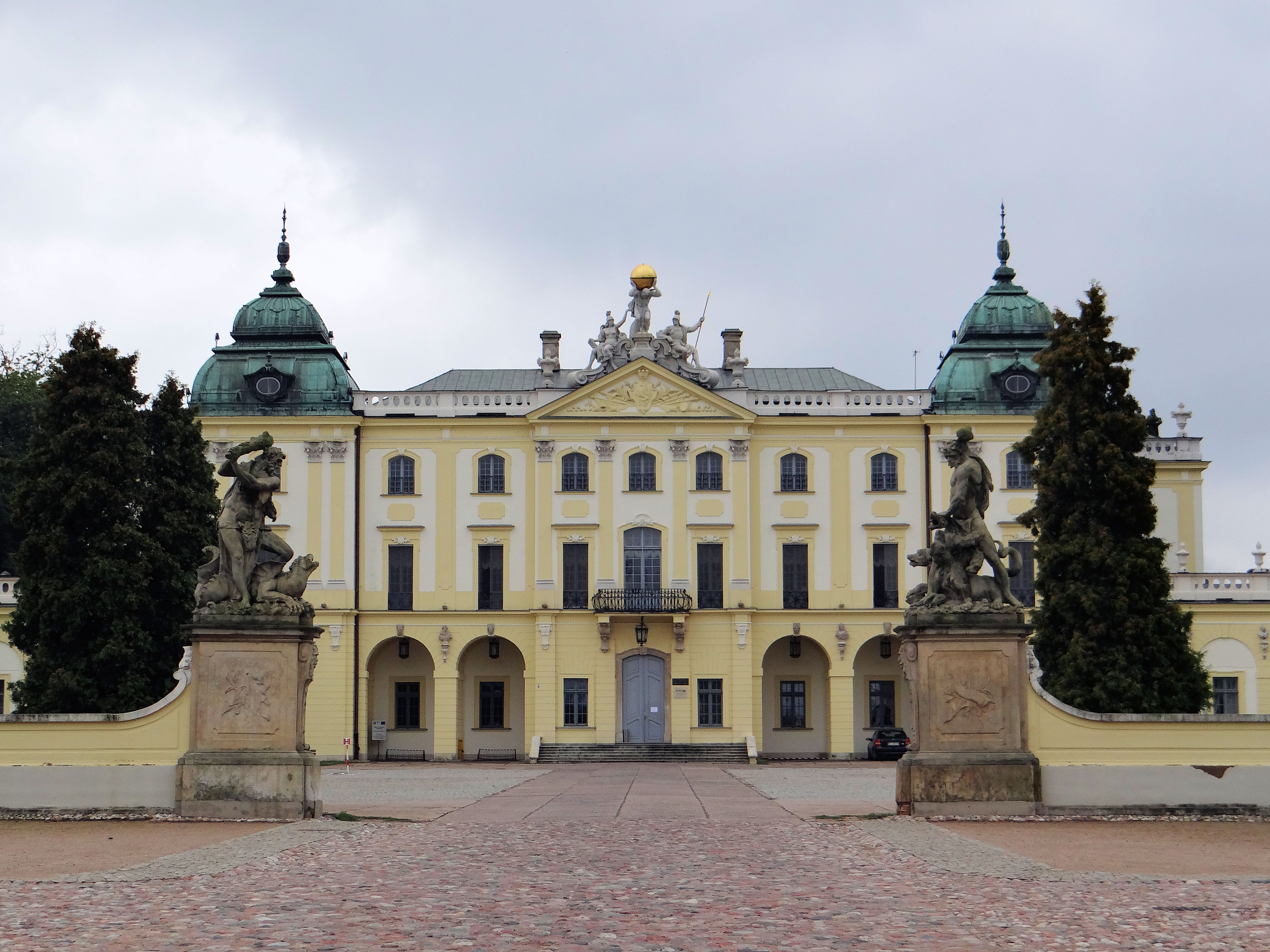
- University seat at the Branicki Palace
- Latin: Universitas Medica Bialostocensis
- Type: Public
- Established: February 3, 1950
- Affiliations: Socrates-Erasmus
- Rector: prof. dr hab. n. med. Marcin Moniuszko
- Students: 5,931 (12.2023)
- Location: Kilińskiego 1, 15-089, Białystok, Poland
- Website: www.umb.edu.pl

The Medical University of Białystok (UMB; Polish: Uniwersytet Medyczny w Białymstoku) is a medical university located in Białystok, the capital of Podlaskie Voivodeship in northeastern Poland. The university makes use of a number of buildings, most of them located in the city's central district, among them the historic building from the 18th century, Branicki Palace. The university is closely working with the nearby University Clinical Hospital and the University Children Clinical Hospital.

The university is home to the Medical Department with a Division of Dentistry and a six-year M.D. program taught in English (English Division), Pharmacology Department with Medical Analytics Division, and a Nursing and Health Protection Department with divisions in Physiotherapy, Medical Rescue, Obstetrics, Public Health and Nursing.

== History ==
The official application for the establishment of the Medical Academy in the Białystok was submitted by Chairman of the Voivodeship National Council in Białystok, Mieczysław Tureniec at the meeting of that body, on July 21, 1949. He argued as follows:

...One of the reasons preventing the introduction of universal free health care today is the lack of doctors. The outcome of the war for the medical world in Poland was catastrophic. We had about 12,500 before the war, about 50% died, now we have about 7,300 doctors. […] The government appreciates the seriousness of the threat and has already launched, in addition to the medical faculties at the Universities of Warsaw, Kraków, Łódź, Poznań, Wrocław and Lublin, the Medical Academies in Gdańsk, Szczecin and Bytom. […] In the near future we have to establish another Medical Academy. The question arises where it is to be established. […] If we take a look at the map, it becomes clear that the Academy must be established in Białystok.

The Medical University of Białystok was created in accordance with an order of the Council of Ministers signed on February 3, 1950. The initial activities for establishing the university occurred at the beginning of 1949. The founding father of the university was Dr. Jerzy Sztachelski and Professor Tadeusz Kielanowski presided as the first rector.

The main seat of the Medical University of Białystok was (and is still) in the 18th century Branicki Palace, the most magnificent and precious historic structure in Białystok. The first theoretical science departments were housed adjacent to the palace in Collegium Primum. In the second year of existence the university obtained the right to confer scientific degrees. In 1953, the first clinical departments were created, and in 1954, Collegium Universum was built to house the majority of the theoretical science departments. In 1955, the academic journal, Annals of the Medical University of Białystok, was issued for the first time and is still being published today. In 1956, another academic journal, Medyk Białostocki, was briefly published before it prematurely discontinued. In 2000, the decision to resume publication of the Medyk Białostocki was made.

The State Clinical Hospital of the Medical University of Białystok was opened in 1962 and in 1968 the Division of Dentistry was created. In 1977, the Faculty of Pharmacy with the Division of Medical Analytics was established; there was no initial recruitment until 1987, when the first group of students began their studies at the Faculty of Pharmacy with the Division of Medical Analytics. In 1982, Collegium Pathologicum was opened and the Children's Teaching Hospital began admitting patients in 1988. In 1999, Collegium Novum was opened, with the Division of Nursing also created that same year. In 2004, the English Division was created and the inaugural class of the English-language six-year M.D. program began their studies in 2005.In the 2026 Times Higher Education World University Rankings by Subject (Clinical and Health), the Medical University of Białystok was placed in the 801–1000 band.

== People of the University ==
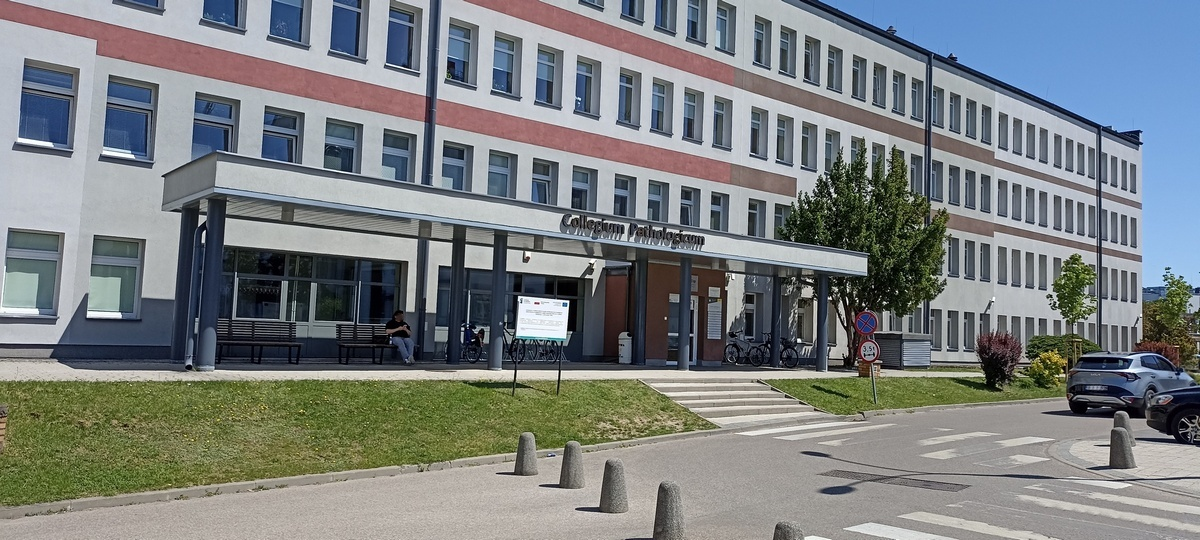
Collegium Pathologicum

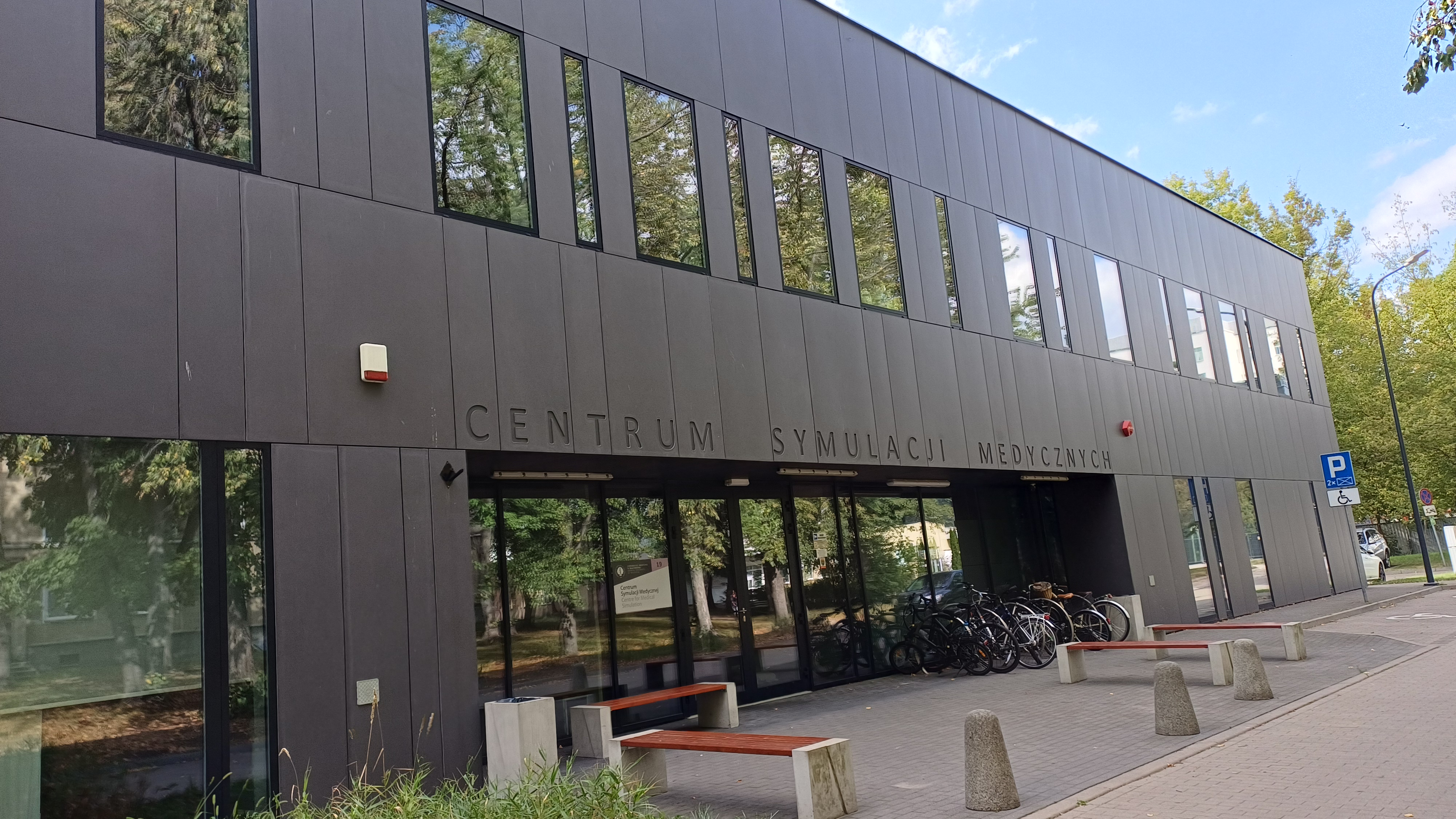
Medical Simulation Center

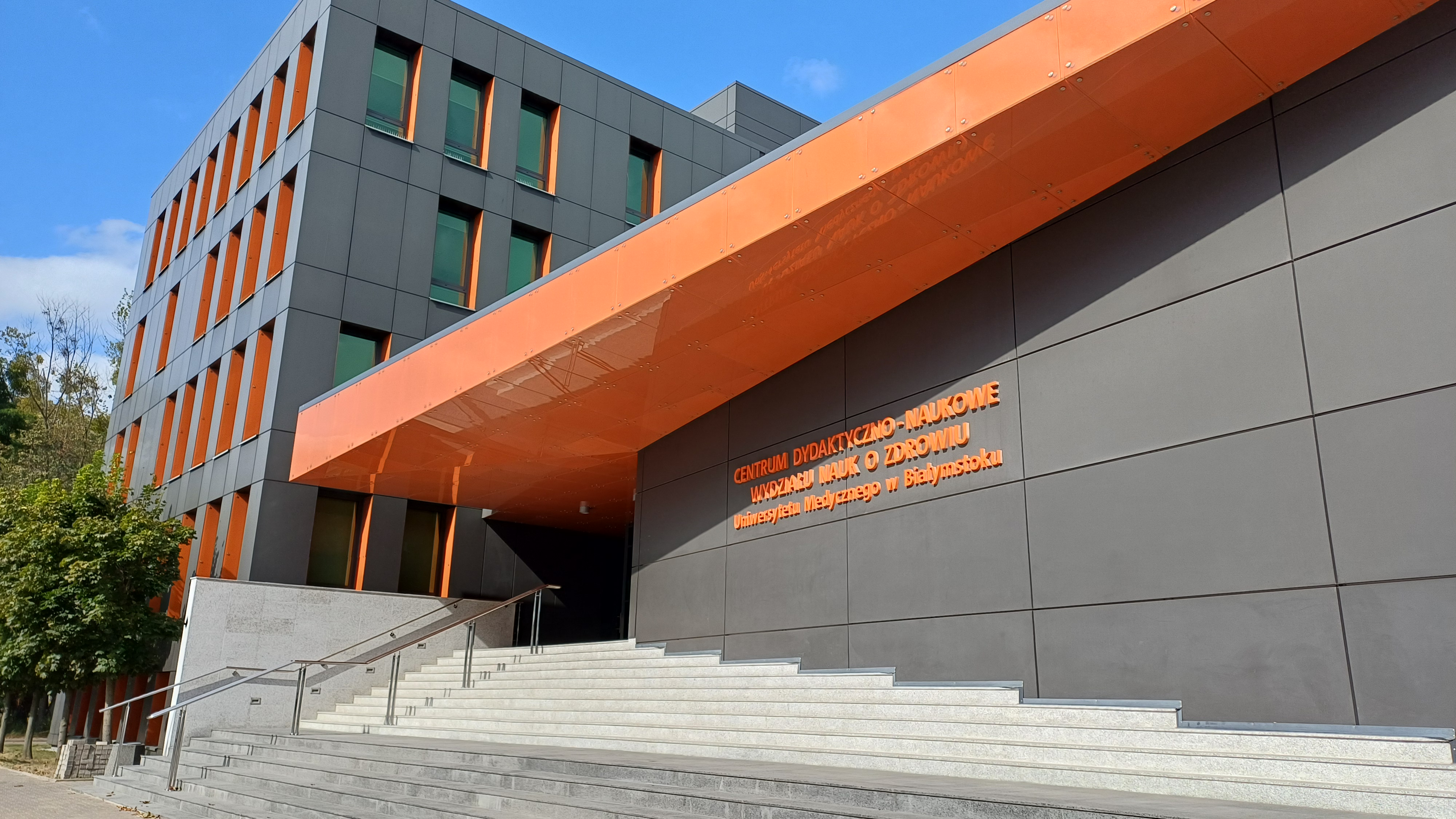
Teaching and Research Center

=== Numbers ===
The total number of students is 5,500. Medical studies at the university take six years to complete. Dentistry and Pharmacy take five years to complete.

The academic faculty is composed of 115 professors, 153 habilitated doctors, and approximately 800 academic teachers.

Many of the university graduates hold executives positions in other medical universities and medical center in Poland and abroad. Over 13,000 graduates have obtained a degree from the Medical University in Białystok.

=== Students ===
One of the oldest student organizations is the University Choir. It was founded in 1951 by a group of students, but today it is a mixed choir which consists of students and doctors of the university. The choir performs oratorio works as well as sacred and secular a cappella compositions. The University Choir takes part in many international festivals and competitions in both Poland and abroad. The UMB Choir won 2 gold medals, in the Sacred Music and Contemporary Music categories, at the 2019 'Mundi Cantat' International Choir Competition in Olomouc, Czech Republic.

The Students’ Scientific Society is an organization of medical students and interns engaged in the work of Students’ Scientific Circles operating in almost all departments of the university. They carry out laboratory experiments, conduct clinical research and acquire practical skills. Some of the students are co-authors of publications in Polish and foreign professional journals. The Polish Dental Students Association was founded in 1997 in Wroclaw. The main goal of the association is to create the structures that represent dentistry students and look after their business in different areas.

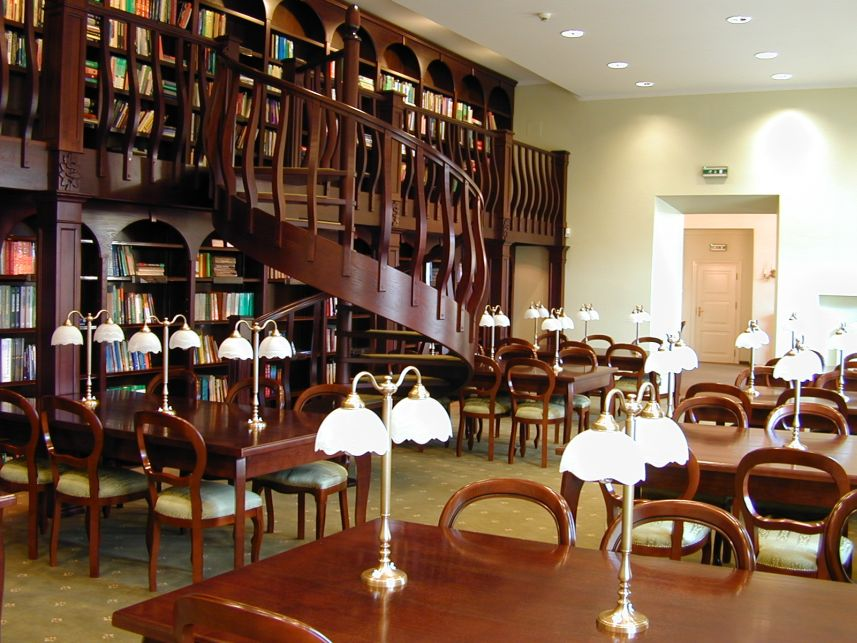
UMB Student Library

In the spring semester of 2018, the American Medical Student Association - Białystok Chapter (AMSA Białystok) was established at the Medical University of Białystok. The organization's goal is to help students which aim to become doctors in the United States in the process of taking the USMLE and their future career path. AMSA Białystok also organizes social events, fundraisers and community service programs, as well as collaborating with UMB's other student organizations, such as IFMSA Białystok and GMS (German Medical Students) Białystok e.v.

=== Faculty ===
- Rector: Professor Adam Jacek Krętowski
- Vice Rector of Students Affairs: Professor Adrian Chabowski
- Vice Rector for Scientific Affairs: Professor Marcin Moniuszko
- Vice Rector for Clinical Affairs: Professor Janusz Bogdan Dzięcioł
- Dean of the Faculty of Medicine with the Division of Dentistry and English Division: Assoc. Professor Tomasz Hryszko
- Professor Dr. Jakub Chlebowski was a Chancellor and Vice-Chancellor

== Teaching hospitals ==
University Clinical Hospital in Białystok (Polish: Uniwersytecki Szpital Kliniczny w Białymstoku) is a teaching and research center for UMB's various departments. In addition, it offers a wide variety of health services, ranging from simple procedures to highly specialized ones, all financed by the Ministry of Health. Approximately 55,000 patients are hospitalized at the UMB Clinical Hospital yearly, and approximately 203,000 patients are provided with consultations.

University Children Clinical Hospital in Białystok (Polish: Uniwersytecki Dziecięcy Szpital Kliniczny im. dr Ludwika Zamenhofa) is the second biggest hospital in the city. Its modern equipment and professional teaching staff make up an excellent teaching base for medical students. About 10,000 sick children are hospitalized here yearly. Another 120,000 are given consultations in out-patient departments.
