= Military Cemetery in Białystok =

Polish military cemetery

- Cmentarz wojskowy w Białymstoku
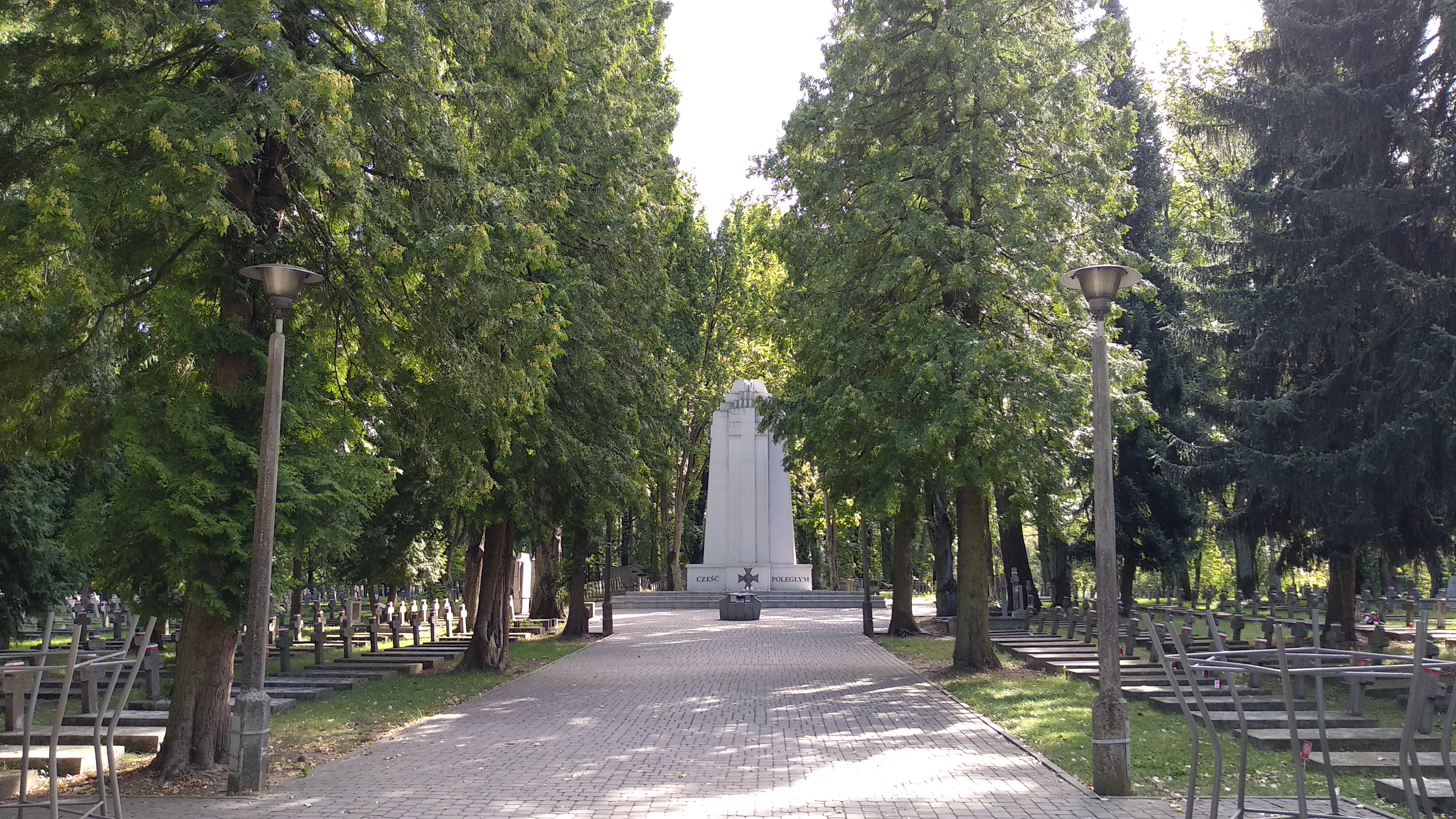
- Interactive map of Military Cemetery in Białystok

Details
- Established: 1920
- Location: 11 Listopada street, Białystok
- Country: Poland
- Coordinates: 53°07′11″N 23°09′40″E
- Type: Military cemetery
- Owned by: Białystok City Hall
- Size: 14.41 hectares (35.6 acres)

Military Cemetery in Białystok (Polish: Cmentarz wojskowy w Białymstoku) is located next to the Constitution of 3 May Park in Mickiewicza District.

== History ==
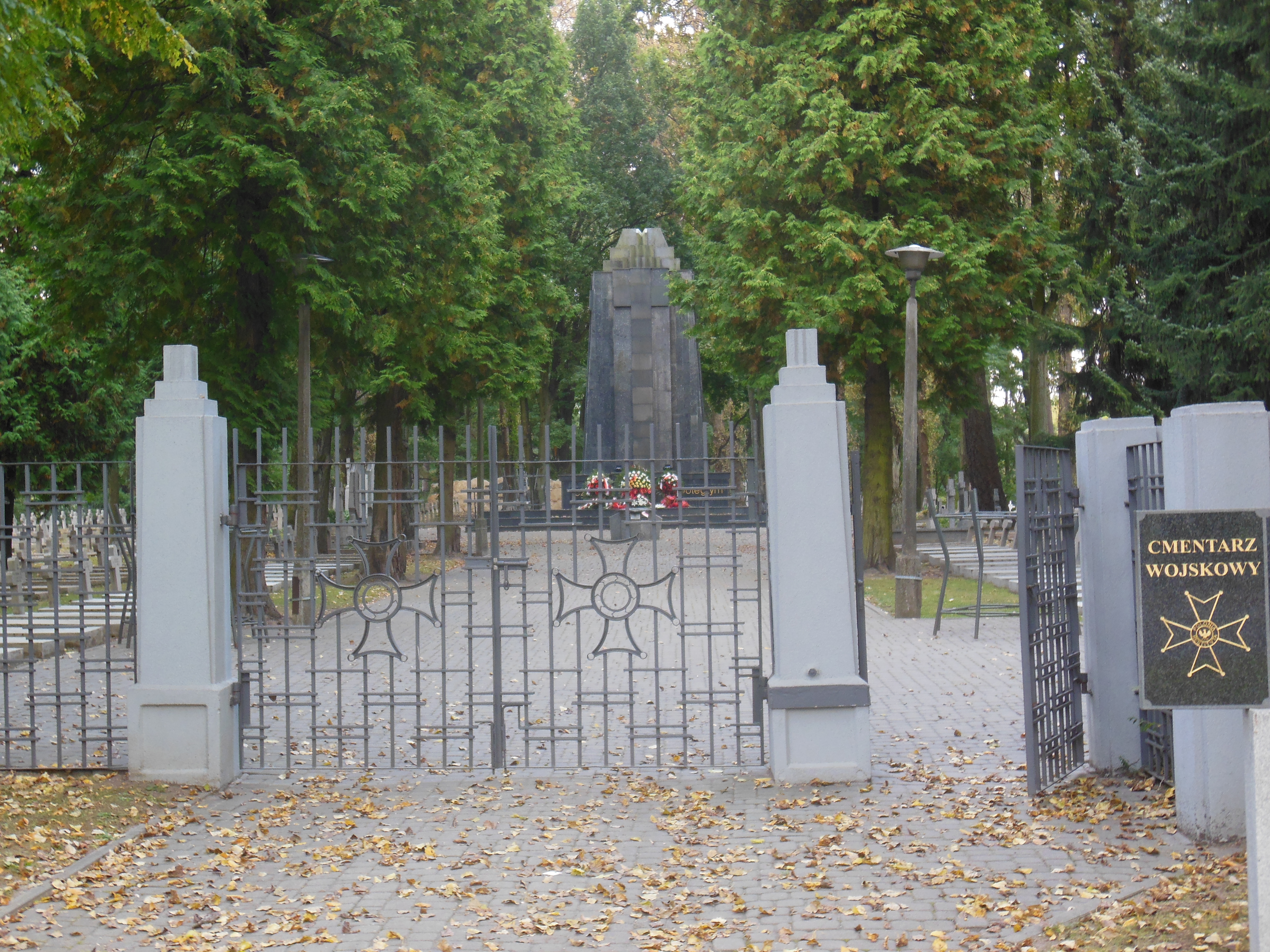
Entrance to the cemetery

At the outbreak of World War I, a temporary military cemetery was organized in the place today's Polskie Radio station location on Świerkowa Street, where Russian soldiers who died from wounds were buried. Following the expulsion of Russians from Białystok in August 1915, the Germans entered the city and buried their soldiers in the cemetery established earlier by the Russians. After Białystok regained independence in February 1919 it was decided to establish a new cemetery, so that the graves of Polish soldiers would not be next to German and Russian ones.

In May 1919, a "mixed commission" was established in Białystok to select a site for a military cemetery, consisting of city officials with the temporary president Józef Karol Puchalski, military authorities, and several Białystok doctors. The proposal to establish a cemetery on the site of the existing war cemetery in Zwierzyniec was torpedoed by the city authorities, arguing that the location was too close to summer resorts. According to second proposal the cemetery was to be located near the existing cemetery in Wygoda. Finally, after public consultations the first option was chosen.

The military cemetery in Białystok was established in early 1920, to be used as a resting place for soldiers who died in battles in Białystok and its surroundings in 1919. In 1920 about 300 soldiers killed in the Polish–Soviet War in 1920 were buried in the cemetery. In subsequent years, the remains of Polish soldiers exhumed from graves located in the vicinity of Białystok were placed there.

During World War II, some of the tombstones were destroyed. In their place, soldiers of the Red Army and the Polish Army who died or died in the years 1939-1949 were buried. Following the establishment of the Polish People's Republic, the cemetery also became the final resting place for people who made outstanding contributions to the communist authorities. The last burials date back to 1952.

In 2017 during excavations carried by the Institute of National Remembrance, bones of victims of the Communist government were found in the cemetery. In June 2025 bones of ten more victims were found.
