= Bolesław Szymański =

Bolesław Szymański may refer to:

- Bolesław Szymański (politician) (1877–1940), Polish politician, mayor of Białystok 1919–1928
- Bolesław Szymański (scientist) (born 1950), Polish computer scientist
