= Constitution of 3 May Park (Białystok) =

Park in Białystok, Poland

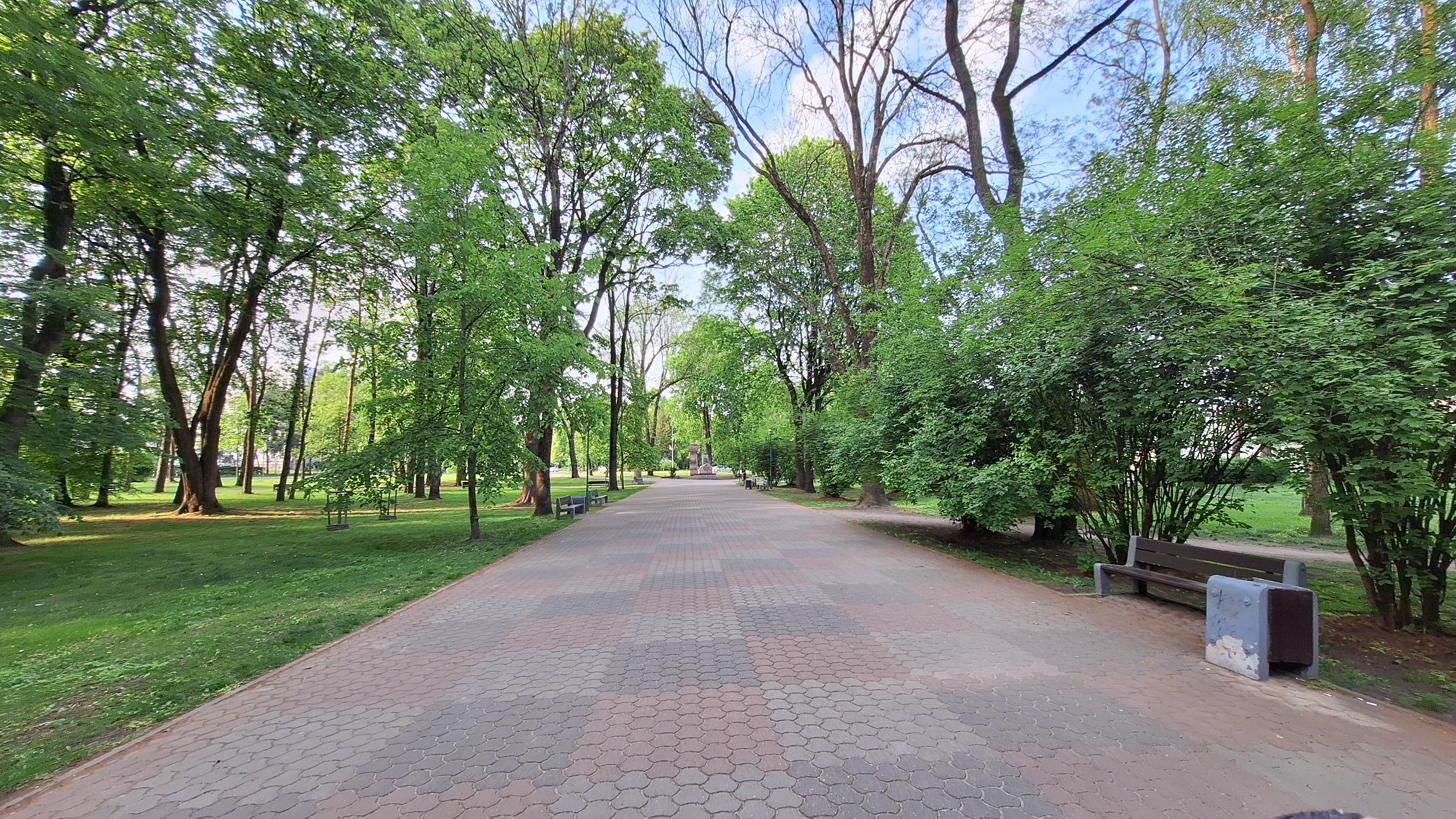
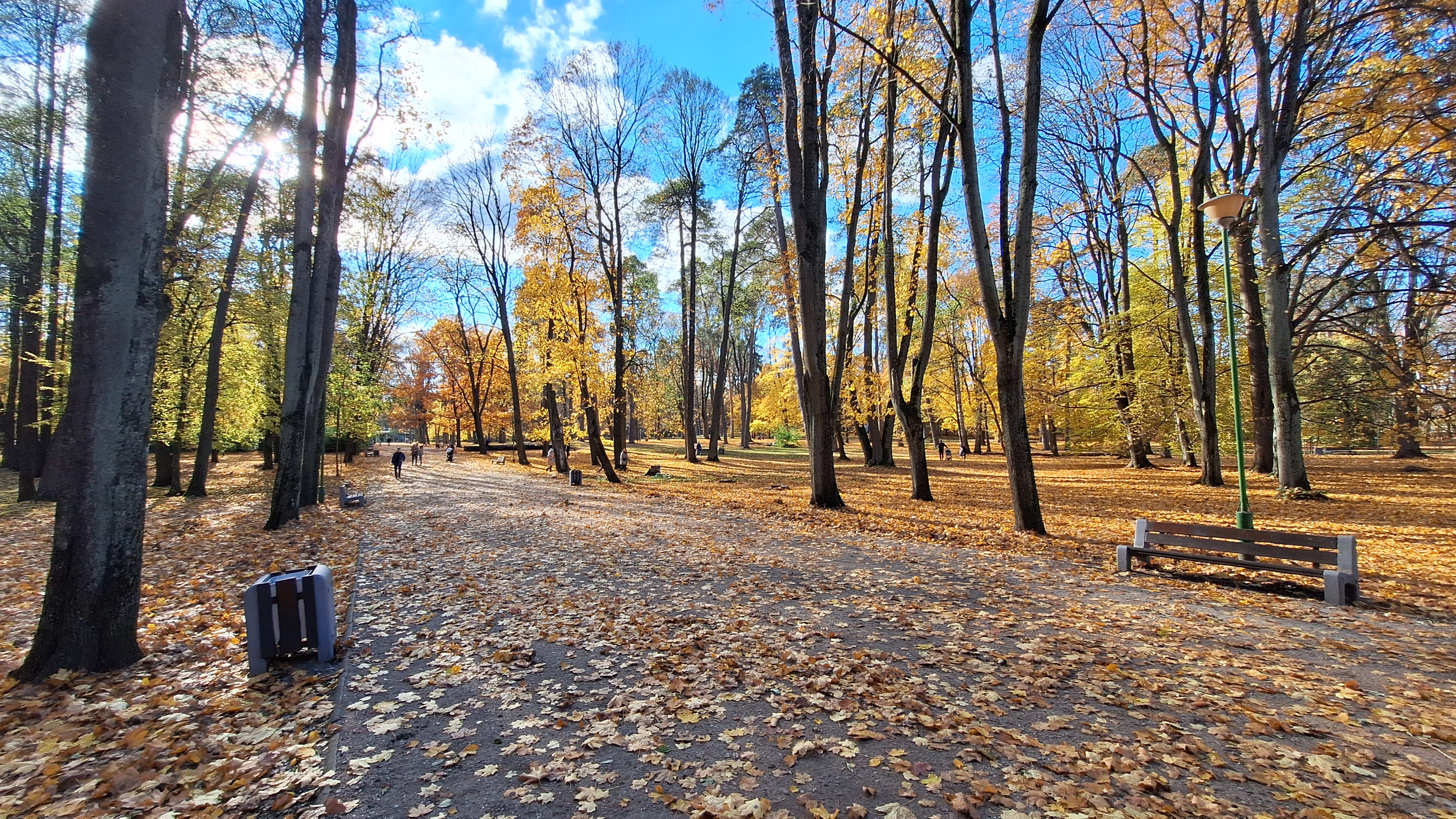
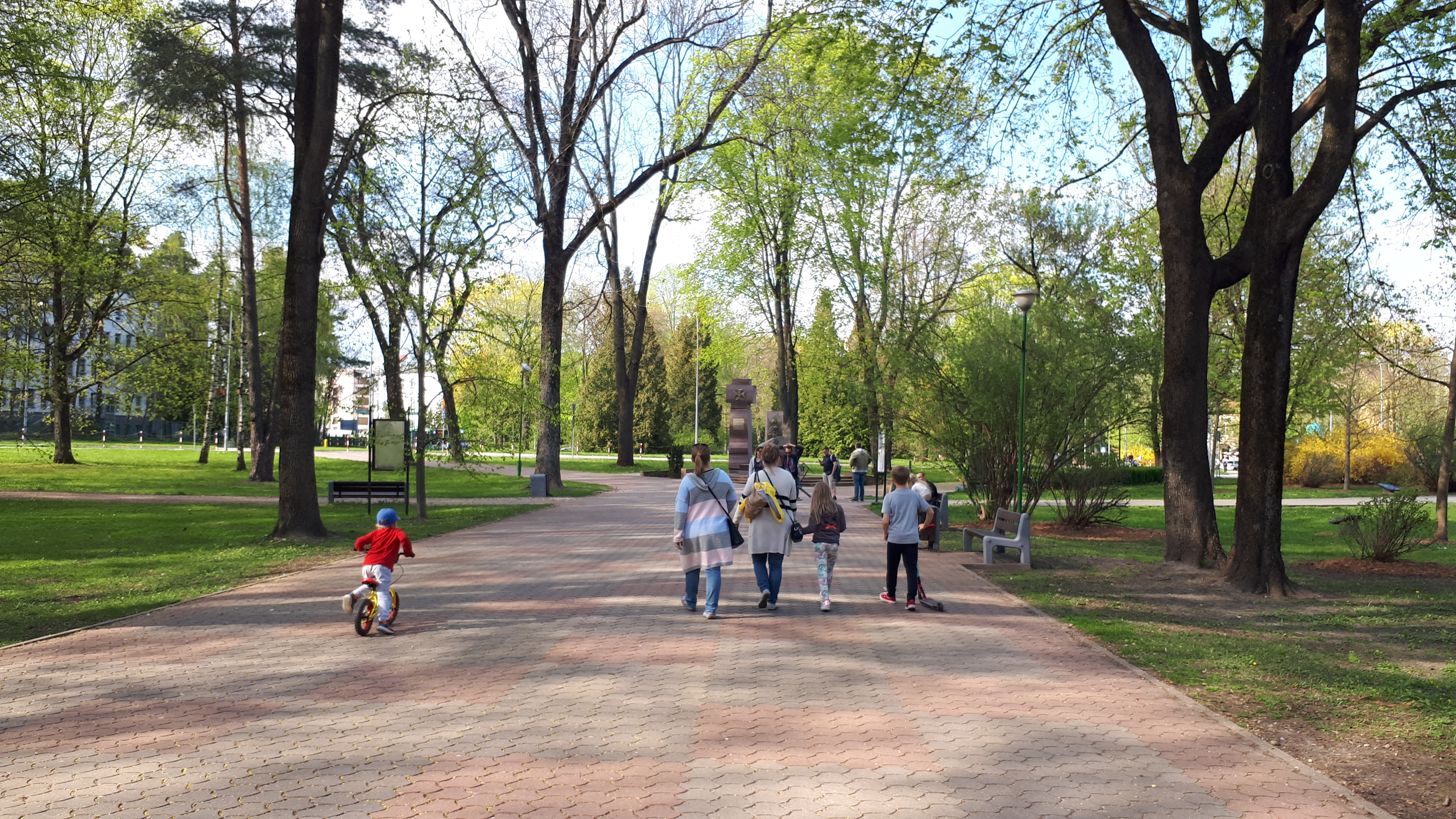
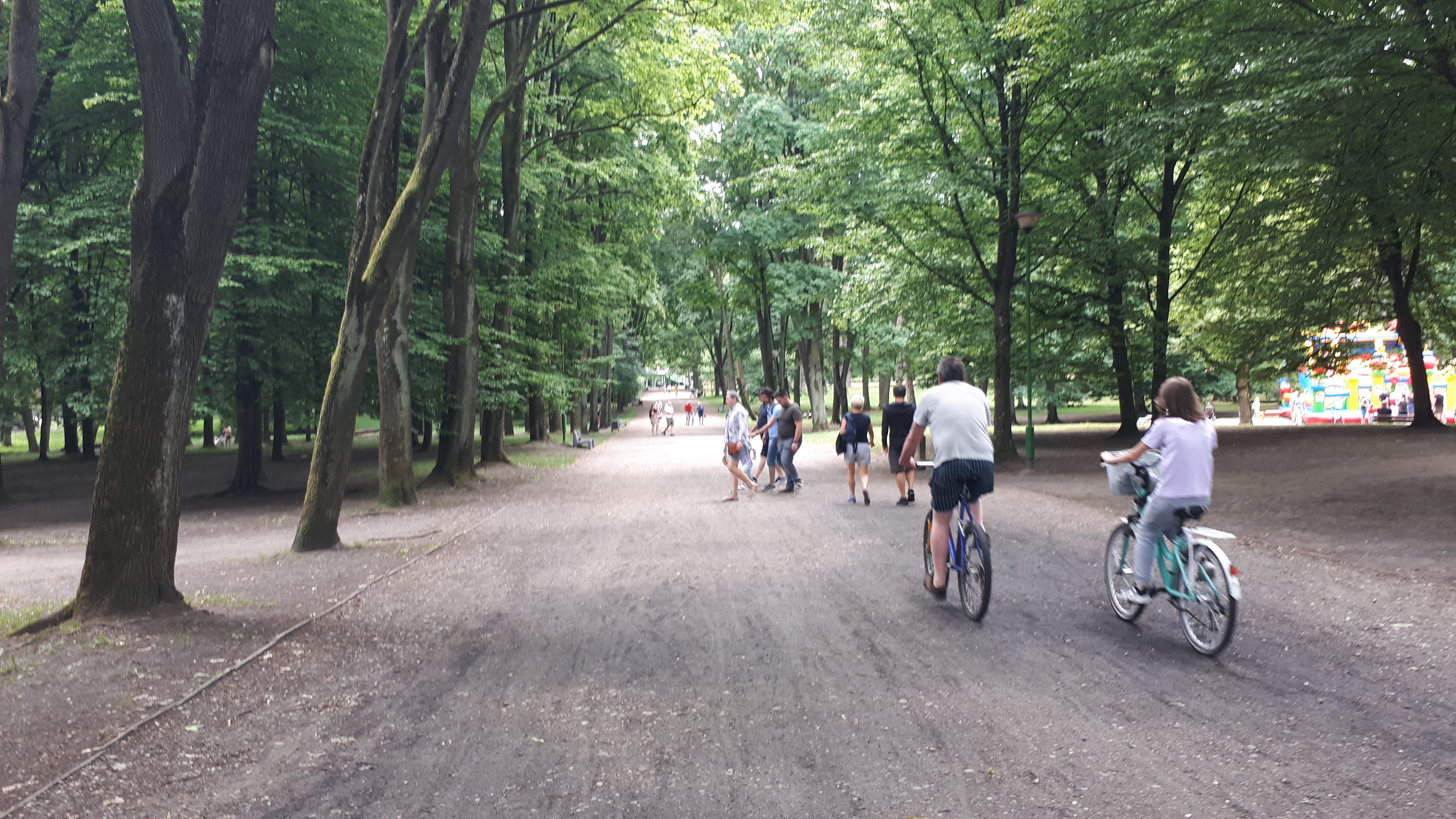
- Interactive map of Constitution of 3 May Park
- Type: Municipal
- Location: Białystok
- Coordinates: 53°07′14″N 23°09′49″E
- Area: 16.2 ha
- Status: Open all year

Constitution of 3 May Park (Polish: Park Konstytucji 3 Maja w Białymstoku) is a park in Piaski District in Białystok, Podlaskie Voivodeship

== History ==
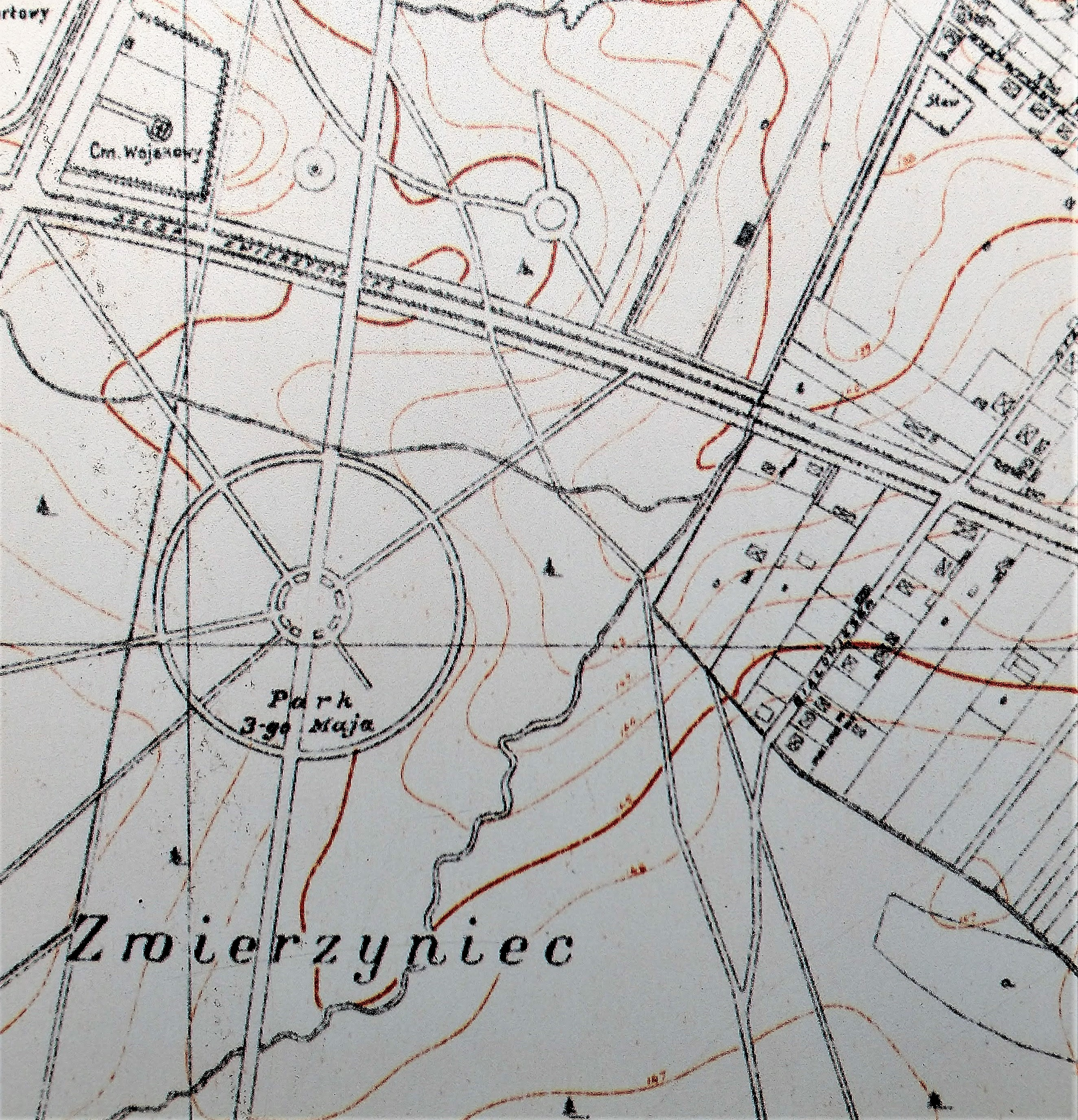
Layout of the park in 1937

The park's territory is located in what was a primeval forest that existed on a much larger territory. From the early centuries of Bialystok's existence the development of the settlement the forest was related to it. Jan Klemens Branicki had part of the forest adapted for breeding animals and pheasants. During the reign of Tsars Alexander I and Nicholas I the forest was part of the palace property. In the second half of the 19th century the area of the forest began shrinking with the ongoing increased human activity and development. At the end of the century Trams in Bialystok began operating, passing in the forest as well.

In May 1919, the Białystok city hall decided to name part of the Zwierzynicki Forest to 3rd May Constitution Park. It covered the area between Wołodyjowskiego, Zwierzyniecka and Podlesna streets. In 1924, work began in the park to mark out 11 Listopada Avenue and prepare for the construction of a sports field, the grand opening of which took place in 1926. First, oak trees were planted there, later a small monument in the shape of a pyramid was built. Despite these works, the park itself was neglected, and the city's residents did not treat it as a place for relaxation and walks. In 1928, the Białystok City Council was even forced to issue a regulation prohibiting hunting birds that flocked to the park. This was due to complaints that the park was impossible to pass through due to the annoying stench of carrion, i.e. ravens shot by "hunters".

Around 1930, it was decided to tidy up the entire park, including the adjacent Zwierzyniecki Forest. According to the designs of engineer J. Rybolowicz, walking paths were marked out. In the central part of the park, a monument was erected to the soldiers of the 42nd Infantry Regiment, who died fighting for Poland's independence. It is the work of brothers Jakub and Kazimierz Juszczyków. The idea of its construction arose in 1928, on the tenth anniversary of regaining independence. An honorary committee was established, headed by the Voivde of Białystok Voivodeship, Karol Kirst. One of the points of the celebrations of the Day of Polonia Restituta was the laying of the cornerstone for the planned monument. It was unveiled on November 30, 1930, on the hundredth anniversary of the outbreak of the November Uprising.

In 1933, on 11 Listopada Avenue, right at its intersection with Wołodyjowskiego Street, a memorial stone was placed in honor of Captain Stanisław Skarżyński, the first Pole to fly solo over the Atlantic. After World War II, the stone was moved deeper into Zwierzyniecki Park.

In 1934, the pitch adjacent to the park was expanded and renamed the Municipal Stadium. Further tidying up this area, which had been neglected for decades, in 1935 the former tram depot, which was located at the end of Świętojańska Street, was demolished. This enabled Zwierzyniecki Forest and Constitution of 3 May Park to be connected to Planty Park, all along the way up to Poniatowski Park, in this way creating a large green complex of relaxation in the city center.

After the outbreak of World War II, the monument disappeared. According to accounts, it was dismantled by the residents of Białystok, who wanted to prevent the desecration of this symbol of patriotism by the Soviets occupying Białystok. Apparently, large fragments of it were buried in the Zwierzyniecki Forest. Searches undertaken in the 1990s were unsuccessful. In 1963 Akcent Zoo was opened on the park's territory.

In 1995, the city council passed a resolution to rebuild the monument. On May 3, 1997, the ceremonial unveiling took place. A replica of the sculpture was made by Białystok sculptor Krzysztof Jakubowski. After World War II, the general name Zwierzyniec was adopted. In September 2000, right at the entrance to the park, a boulder-monument was unveiled in honour of the Polish prisoners who were murdered in Katyn forest.
