= Zwierzyniecki Forest (Białystok) =

Forest in Białystok, Poland

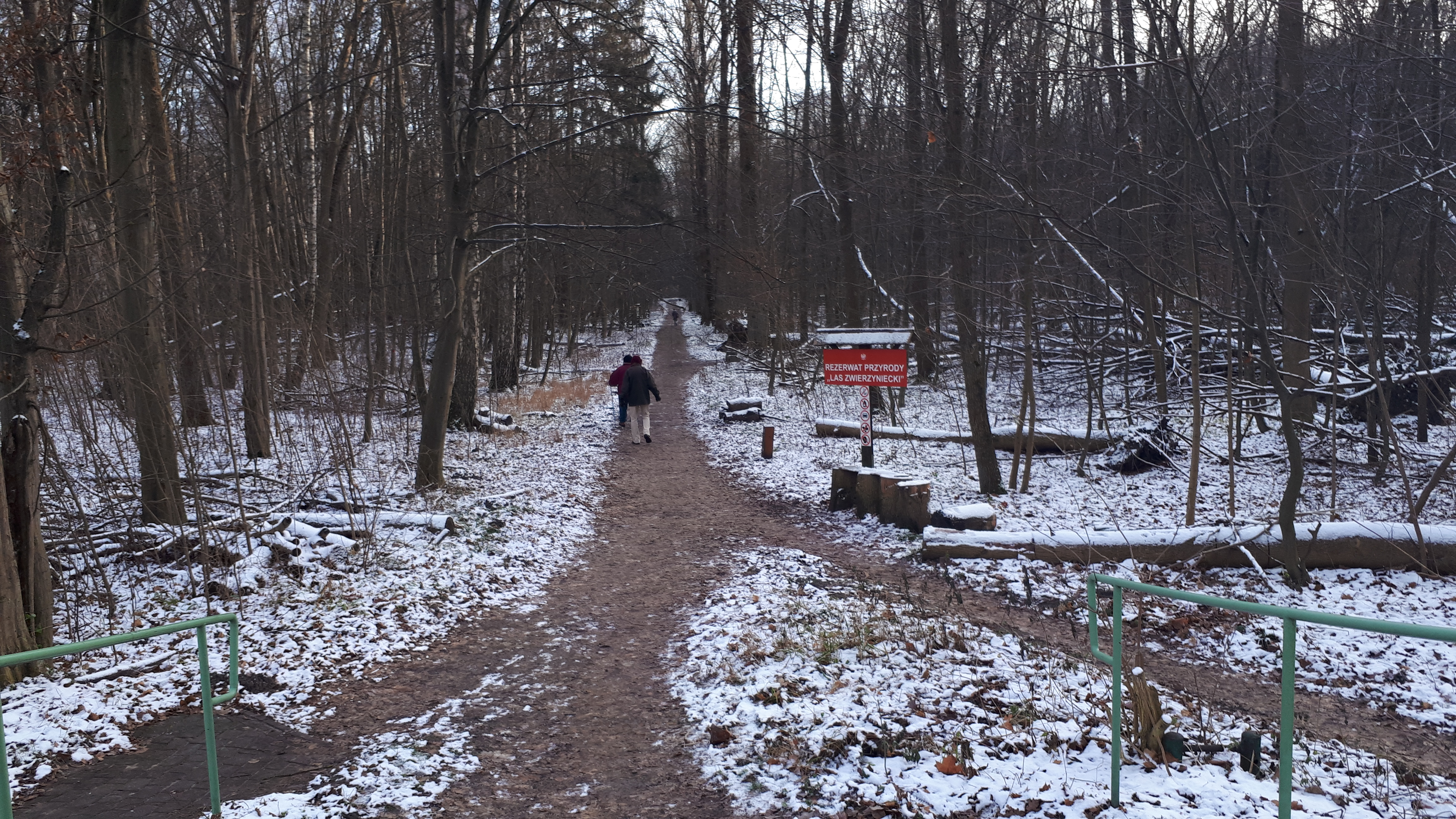
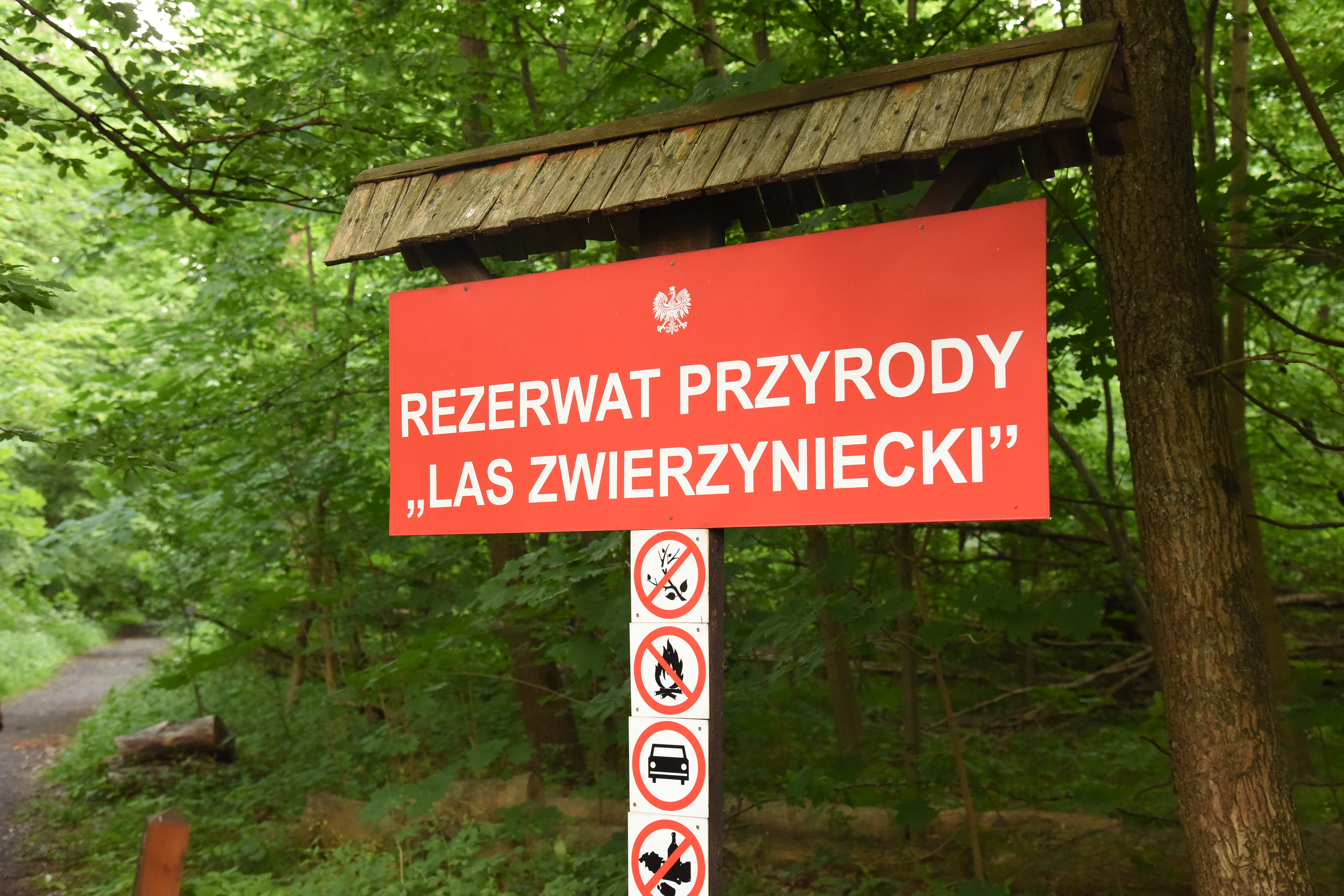
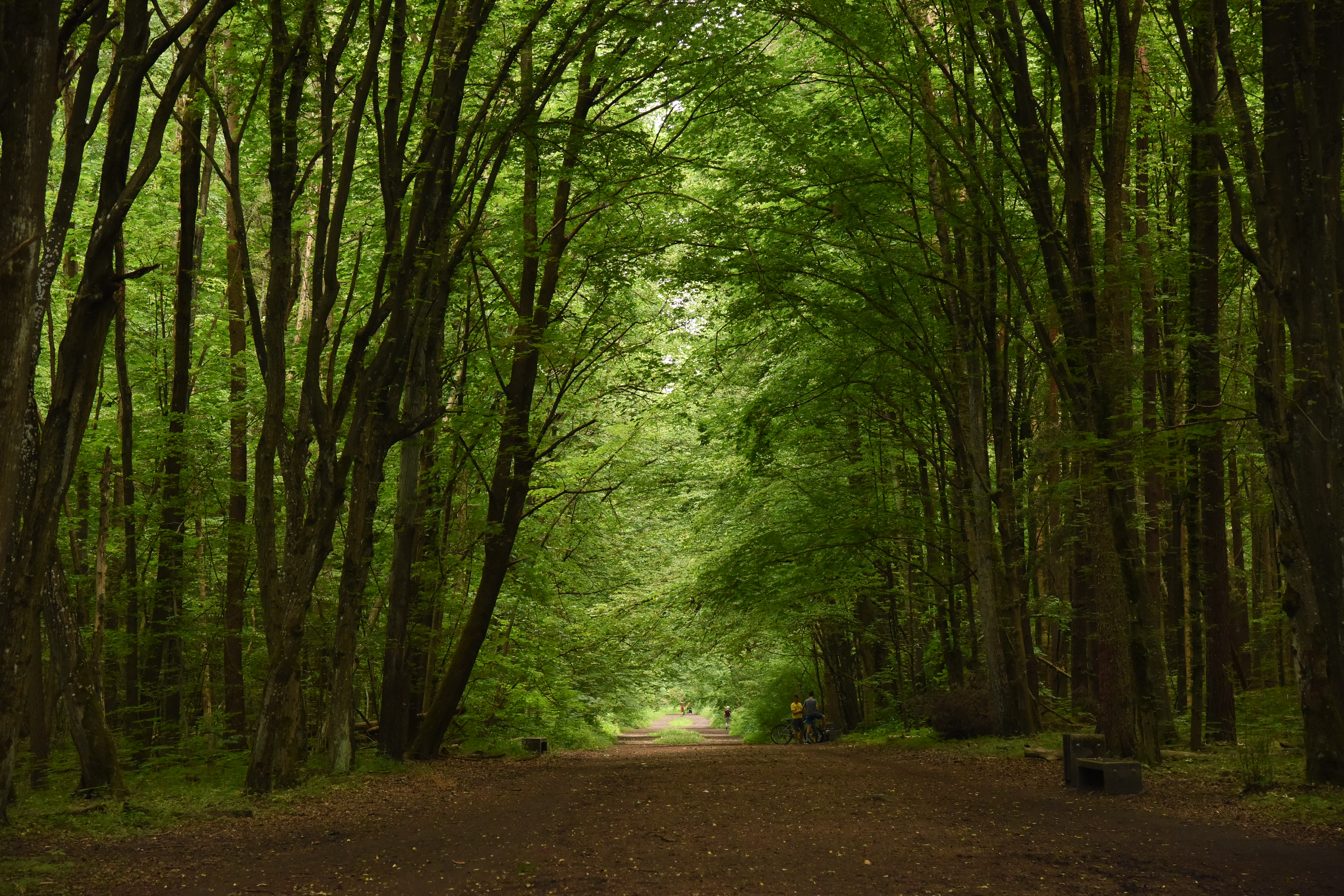
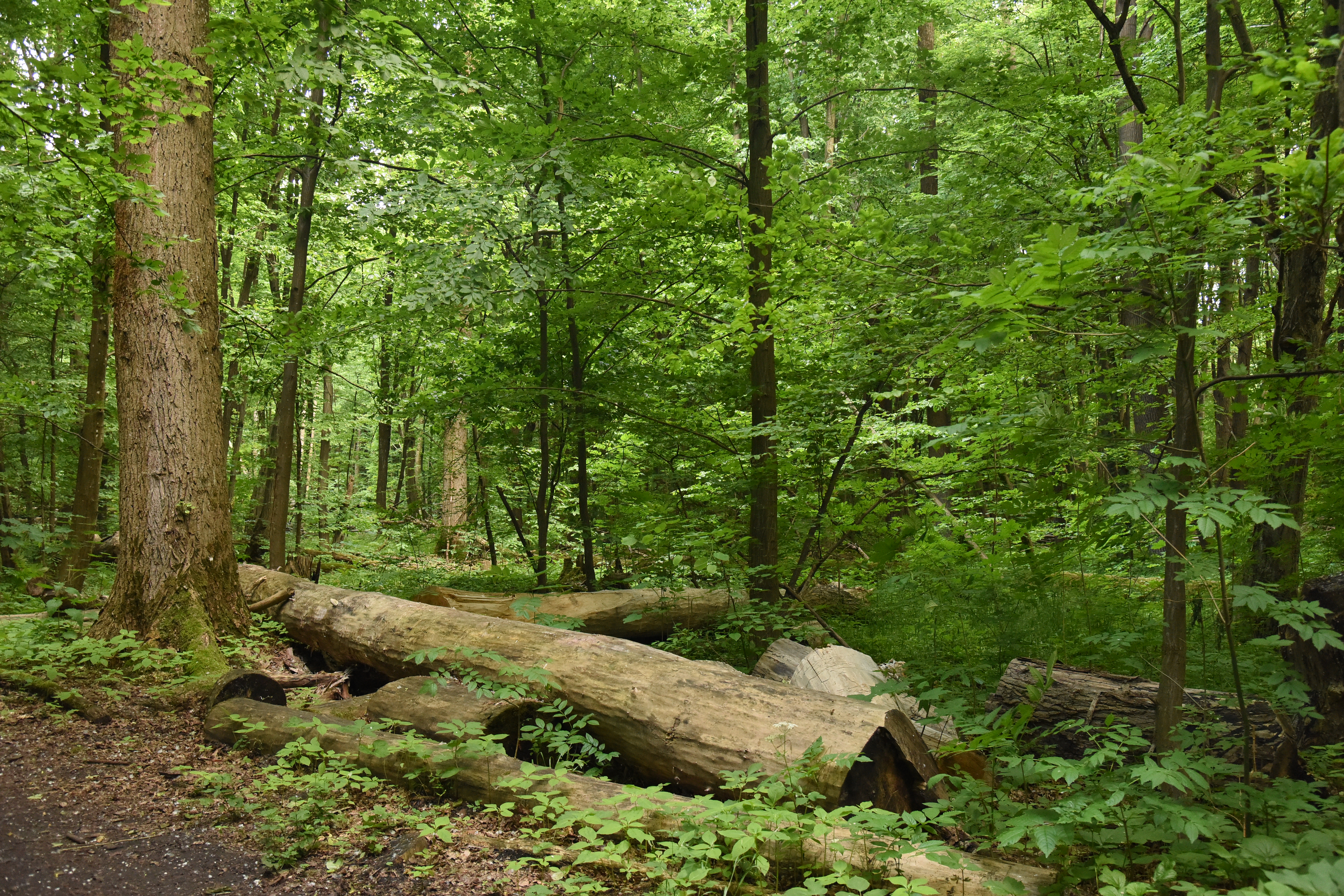
- Interactive map of Zwierzyniecki Forest
- Type: Municipal
- Location: Białystok
- Coordinates: 53°06′56″N 23°09′54″E
- Area: 33.86 ha
- Status: Open all year

Zwierzyniecki Forest (Polish: Las Zwierzyniecki) is a forest and natural reserve in Białystok, Poland.

== History ==
The existing forest is a remanent of a primeval forest that existed on a much larger territory. From the early centuries of Bialystok's existence the development of the settlement the forest was related to it. Jan Klemens Branicki had part of the forest adapted for breeding animals and pheasants. During the reign of Tsars Alexander I and Nicholas I the forest was part of the palace property. In the second half of the 19th century the area of the forest began shrinking with the ongoing increased human activity and development. At the end of the century Trams in Białystok began operating, passing in the forest as well. In 1879, a large section of the forest was cut down to build military barracks of the 61st Vladimir Infantry Regiment on Piwna Street (after the war demolished to make place for the Voivodeship Hospital and the University Clinical Hospital). At the end of the 1880s, the forest mass was divided by the Białystok-Baranowice strategic military road (currently Zwierzyniecka Street). At the same time, in the southwestern part of the forest, on the site of the former forester's lodge from the Branicki times, wooden restaurant pavilions were built on the initiative of the city authorities.

As a result, the remaining forest gained protection and its recreational merits became valued. Following the regaining of the independence, the newly formed Polish Army also wanted to keep this forest as a protection of a garrison with large transport junction. During World War I, an evangelical cemetery was established in the location of today's Polskie Radio, where German soldiers who died in local hospitals were buried.

During the Second Polish Republic the forest became a popular destination for spending spring weekends, along with Dojlidy Ponds.

During the Second World War the forest suffered from the German and Soviet occupants who cut down many trees.

In the years 1946–1947, those executed by death sentence in the Central Prison of Białystok, and perhaps also those killed in UB raids, were buried in passages between existing graves and in drainage ditches surrounding the cemetery. Probably several to a dozen or so corpses were found there at that time. They were buried in wooden boxes - makeshift coffins, and sometimes without them. The entire Zwierzniecki Forest surrounding the cemetery was covered with a network of ditches and trenches, which could also be used to bury the remains of convicts. In the 1960s, the cemetery was razed to the ground, and the headquarters of Radio Białystok was built in its place. During construction, between regular cemetery burials, human remains buried irregularly were found. In 2002, an exhumation was carried out on the undeveloped part of the property of the former cemetery. No remains were found that could be considered remains of post-war burials. However, witnesses indicated that the graves they mentioned were located in the part of the cemetery that is currently occupied by the radio building. In 2017 during excavations carried by the Institute of National Remembrance, bones of victims of the Communist government were found in the nearby military cemetery. In June 2025 bones of ten more victims were found.
