= Białystok City Council =

Local government body in Białystok, Poland

City Council in Białystok Rada Miasta Białystok

Type
- Type: Unicameral

Leadership
- Chairman: Katarzyna Jamróz, KO
- Vice-Chairmen: Katarzyna Kisielewska-Martyniuk, KO; Marek Stanisław Tyszkiewicz, KO; Alicja Biały, PiS

Structure
- Seats: 28
- Political groups: Mayoral coalition (16): Civic Coalition (14); Independent (2); Opposition (12): Law and Justice (12)

Elections
- Voting system: Multi-member electoral districts with five-year terms
- Last election: 7 April 2024
- Next election: 2029

Website
- www.bialystok.pl/pl/dla_mieszkancow/samorzad/rada_miasta/

The Białystok City Council (Polish: Rada Miasta Białystok) is the governing body of the city of Białystok in Poland. The council has 28 elected members elected every five years in an election by city voters through a secret ballot. The election of city council and the local head of government, which takes place at the same time, is based on legislation introduced on 20 June 2002.

== History ==
In 1808, on the orders of Senator Theyls, the Russians placed the Białystok Gymnasium in this building. In 1858, the Gymnasium was moved to the building at 8 Warszawska Street. The offices of the City Council and City Hall moved into the vacated building. From 1888, the city's Orthodox primary school was also located here.

=== Second Polish Republic ===
The first independent city parliament in the city was formed with the regaining of independence from the Russian Empire and the establishment of the Polish Second Republic in February 1919, called the Temporary City Committee, led by Józef Karol Puchalski. The Committee included well-known and respected citizens. The new authorities ensured they represented the Polish, Jewish, German, and Russian communities. Therefore, next to Marian Dederko, Bohdan Ostromęcki, and Witold Kości, there were, among others, Salomon Trylling, Falk Kempner, Izaak Pines, August Moes, and Dymitr Ginc. On February 8, 1919, one of the most important meetings of the Committee took place at the presence of the German commissar.

Following the dissolving of the city council in mid-1927, elections were set to December 11 that year. Among the electoral blocs running in the election were the Polish Electoral Committee of Economic Work, whose election platform aimed to culturally uplift the suburbs and outskirts of the city, inhabited primarily by working people, by supporting construction, school construction, crafts, and cheap loans. The Union of Polish Electoral Committee, representing the right wing and headed by President Szymański, issued a proclamation on November 18, 1927, in Dziennik Białostocki. The Union of Jewish National Bloc (Polish: Zjednoczenie Żydowskiego Bloku Narodowego) won 9 seats and became the largest faction in the city council, followed by Union of the Polish Electoral Committee (Polish: Zjednoczenie Polskiego Komitetu Wyborczego) with 8 seats, General Jewish Workers' Union "Bund" (Polish: Ogólne żydowski Związek Robotniczy „Bund") with 6 seats, Property Owners Election Committee (Polish: Komitet Wyborczy Wlaścicieli Nieruchomości) and Polish Electoral Committee of Economic Work (Polish: Polski Komitet Wyborczy Pracy Gospodarczej) each received 4 seats, Union of Electoral Commissions of Former Military Personnel (Polish: Zjednoczenie Kom. Wyborcz. byłych Wojskowych) and PPS Class Trade Unions (Polish: PPS Klasowe Związki Zawodowe) each with 3, Citizens of the Orthodox Community (Polish: Obywateli gminy prawosławnej) and Craftsmen of the city of Białystok (Polish: Rzemieślników m. Bialegostoku) with two mandates each and Non-partisan voters (Polish: Wyborcy bezpartyjni) with one mandate. The Zionist-Democratic "Hitachduth" (Polish: Syjonistyczno-Demokratyczny „Hitachduth") and Poale Zion failed to pass the threshold and did not enter the city council.

In May 1939, at the 1938–39 Polish local elections 48 deputies were elected to the Białystok City Council under the following division: PPS and class trade unions - 6, Bund and class trade unions - 10, Jewish Democratic Bloc (Polish: Żydowski Demokratyczny Blok - 3, General Jewish Bloc (Polish: Ogólny Blok Żydowski) - 3, Christian National-Economic Electoral Committee - 21, National Party - 5.

=== World War II ===
The outbreak of World War II interrupted the activities of Białystok's city council. Mayor Seweryn Nowakowski disappeared in circumstances that remain unclear deep within the Soviet Union. The city experienced two tragic occupations: from September 22, 1939, to June 24, 1941, the Soviet occupation, followed by the German occupation. The occupiers completely eliminated the Polish political authorities, installing instead their power structures.

From September 1939 to June 1941, the former municipal building in Warszawska Street was occupied by Soviet administrative authorities. From 1941 to 1944, it housed the occupation office of the city commissioner. In 1944, the Germans burned the building down. After the war, it was demolished. In its place, on the former, unfilled municipal cellars, a temporary barracks was erected. It stood there until the 1980s. At that time, a shopping pavilion was built on this historic site.

=== Polish People's Republic ===
The Act on Local Bodies of Unitary State Authority, passed by the Sejm on March 20, 1950, introduced Soviet solutions alien to Polish society in the form of a unitary administration model characterized by the combination of legislative and executive power within a single state organization. The positions of mayor and vice-mayor were also abolished, replaced by the chairpersons of the Presidium of Municipal National Councils. The chairman of the Presidium of the Municipal National Cocuncil formally held considerable powers, but in practice he could not pursue any independent policy. He had to consult his decisions with the Voivodeship Committee of the Polish United Workers' Party. The first chairman of the Presidium of the Municipal National Cocuncil was Jadwiga Zubrycka.

Until 1948, a certain autonomy of the mayors of Białystok could be observed. After the formation of the Polish United Workers' Party in December 1948, Polish communists took full control of political life.

By the end of the 1980s many political changes occurred in Poland and the Communist system had come to an end. The last meeting of the Municipal National Council in Białystok took place on April 26, 1990. An era in the history of Białystok was ending.

=== Third Polish Republic ===
On May 27, 1990, a fifty-member Białystok City Council was elected. The Solidarity Citizens' Electoral Committee, composed of the Białystok City Committee, the Solidarity Trade Union, the Solidarity Trade Union of Individual Farmers, the Solidarity Trade Union of Crafts and Private Transport, and the Catholic Intelligentsia Club, won a decisive victory, winning 42 of the 50 seats. On June 7, 1990, the first meeting of the new Białystok City Council took place. It consisted of fifty councilors. The Solidarity Citizens' Electoral Committee won 42 of the 50 seats, the Social Democracy of the Republic of Poland won 4 seats, the Christian Democratic Labour Party and the Coalition Electoral Committee each won one seat, the Bema Street Neighborhood Committee won one seat, and the Democratic Party also won one seat. Jerzy Czaban delivered an introductory speech, informing the audience of the financial problems facing the City Hall. The councilors decided that the mayoral elections would be held on a session of the city council on June 18, 1990. This position was to go to the person who received two-thirds of the vote. The vote was secret with 49 councilors participated.

On June 19, 1994, elections were held. The election was won by the "Unity" Electoral Committee, which included: the Centre Agreement, the Christian-National Union, the Independent Self-Governing Trade Union "Solidarity", the Real Politics Union, the Movement for the Republic, the Christian-Democratic Labour Party, and the Association of Catholic Families, introducing 26 councilors to the fifty-member City Council. The Committee managed to unite right-wing groups and organizations referring to Catholic origins in one electoral bloc. This was an exceptional situation compared to other Polish cities. "Unity" ran with the slogan: "Tradition - Family - Future". Lech Rutkowski won the councilor's mandate on the recommendation of "Unity", obtaining the largest number of votes in his electoral district.

Following the death of incumbent mayor Andrzej Lussa, On April 27, 1995, Mieczysław Ilkowski, on behalf of the "Jedność" Councillors' Club, proposed Krzysztof Jurgiel's candidacy for mayor of Białystok to the City Council. After a heated discussion, councillors from the Freedom Union and the Białystok Local Government Club "Left" left the meeting room. There was no quorum and the mayor was not elected. The next attempt to elect Jurgiel as mayor of Białystok took place on May 2, 1995. However, the Council did not make a choice. The next elections were held on May 8, 1995. This time, 35 councilors voted for Jurgiel's candidacy, 9 were against, and 3 abstained.

On December 15, 1995, an extraordinary session of the City Council was held in the auditorium of the Branicki Palace, during which the Field Bishop of the Polish Army, Leszek Sławoj Głódź, received the act of honorary citizen of Białystok from the hands of the Mayor of Białystok, Krzysztof Jurgiel.

On October 11, 1998, in the local government elections, the Solidarity Electoral Action and Unity won a significant victory, winning 29 out of 50 seats in the Białystok City Council, which gave them an absolute majority and the ability to govern the city independently. The Białystok Local Government Coalition Left and Independents "Together" (Alliance of the Democratic Left, the Labor Union, and Orthodox organizations) won 18 seats. The Freedom Union won 3 seats. The turnout in Białystok was 39.9%. The right-wing party nominated Ryszard Tur for the mayor of Białystok. 30 councilors voted for him, 5 against, and 15 councilors abstained. On November 3 he began his term.

== Members of the Białystok City Council ==
Party	District 1	District 2	District 3	District 4	District 5
Civic Coalition	Paweł Gracjan Eshetu-Gabre; Katarzyna Kisielewska-Martyniuk; Michał Karpowicz	Marek Stanisław Tyszkiewicz; Jowita Chudzik; Ewa Tokajuk	Paweł Skowroński; Katarzyna Jamróz; Anna Maria Dobrowolska-Cylwik	Maciej Marek Garley; Karol Konrad Masztalerz; Anna Leonowicz	Marcin Piętka; Jarosław Grodzki; Agnieszka Zabrocka
Law and Justice	Jacek Krzysztof Chańko; Krzysztof Jan Stawnicki	Henryk Dębowski; Piotr Jankowski; Alicja Biały	Bartosz Aleksander Stasiak; Katarzyna Ancipiuk	Katarzyna Siemieniuk; Sebastian Jakub Putra	Agnieszka Małgorzata Rzeszewska; Mateusz Sawicki; Paweł Myszkowski
Third Way			Paweł Skowroński		Joanna Misiuk

== Election results ==
=== 2024 ===
All 28 seats on the city council were being contested in the 2024 election.

Party	Votes	%	Seats
Civic Coalition	41,702	39.42	14
Law and Justice	35,632	33.68	12
Third Way	12,032	11.37	2
Confederation and Nonpartisan Localists	8,927	8.44	0
The Left	5,555	5.25	0
Spoza Stiwy	1,949	1.84	0
Total	105,797	100.00	28
