= Planty Park (Białystok) =

Park in Białystok, Poland

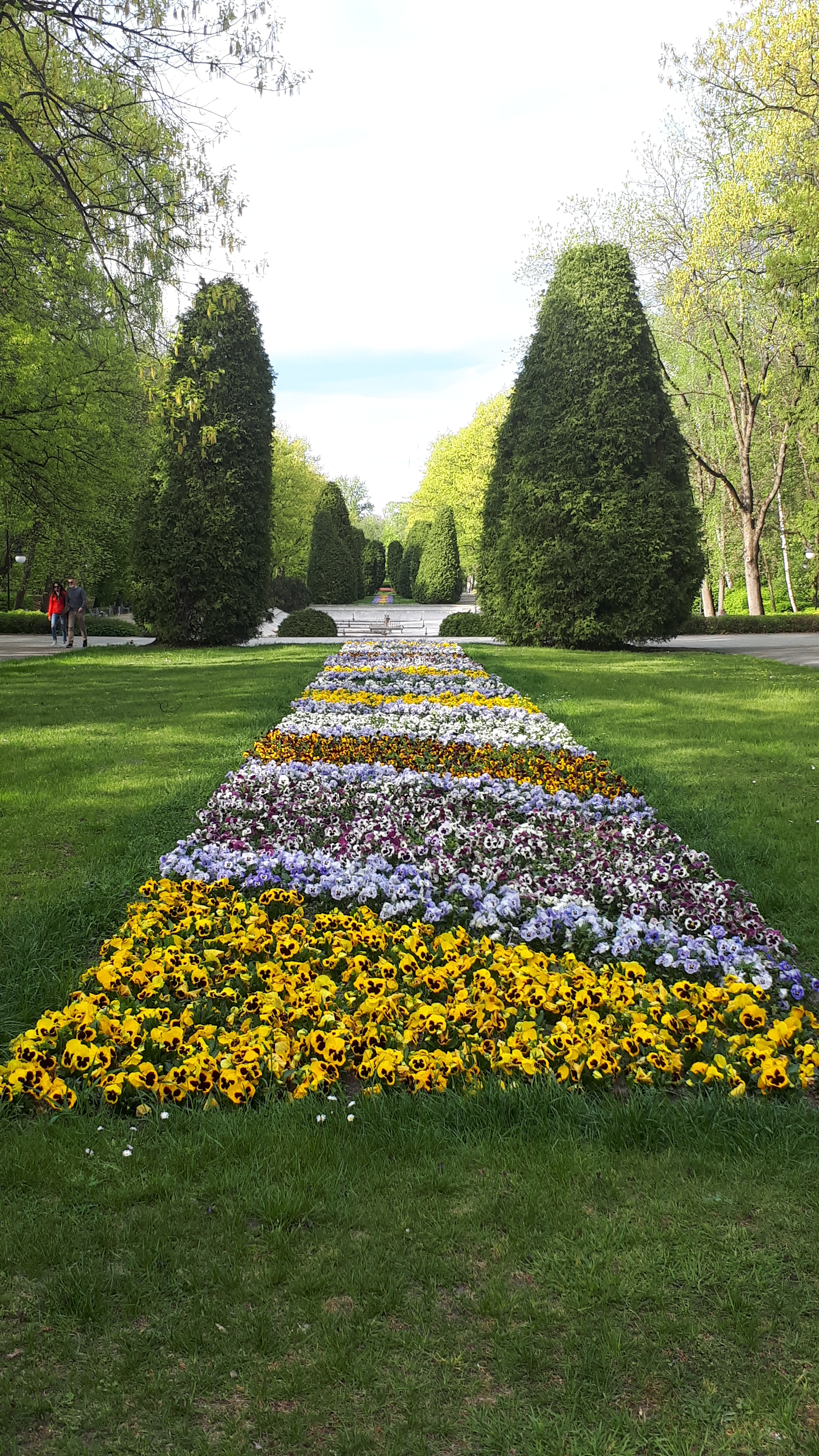
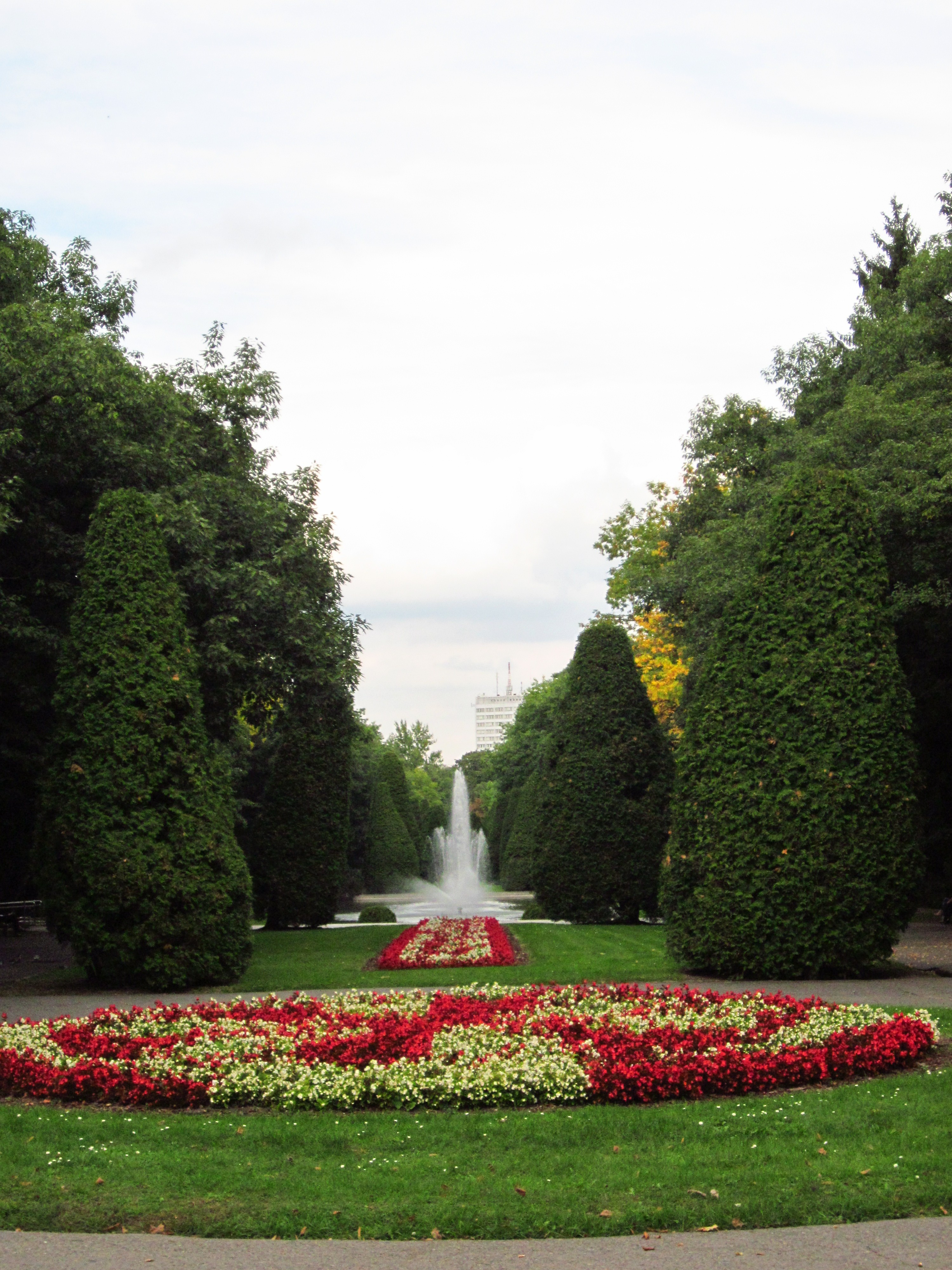
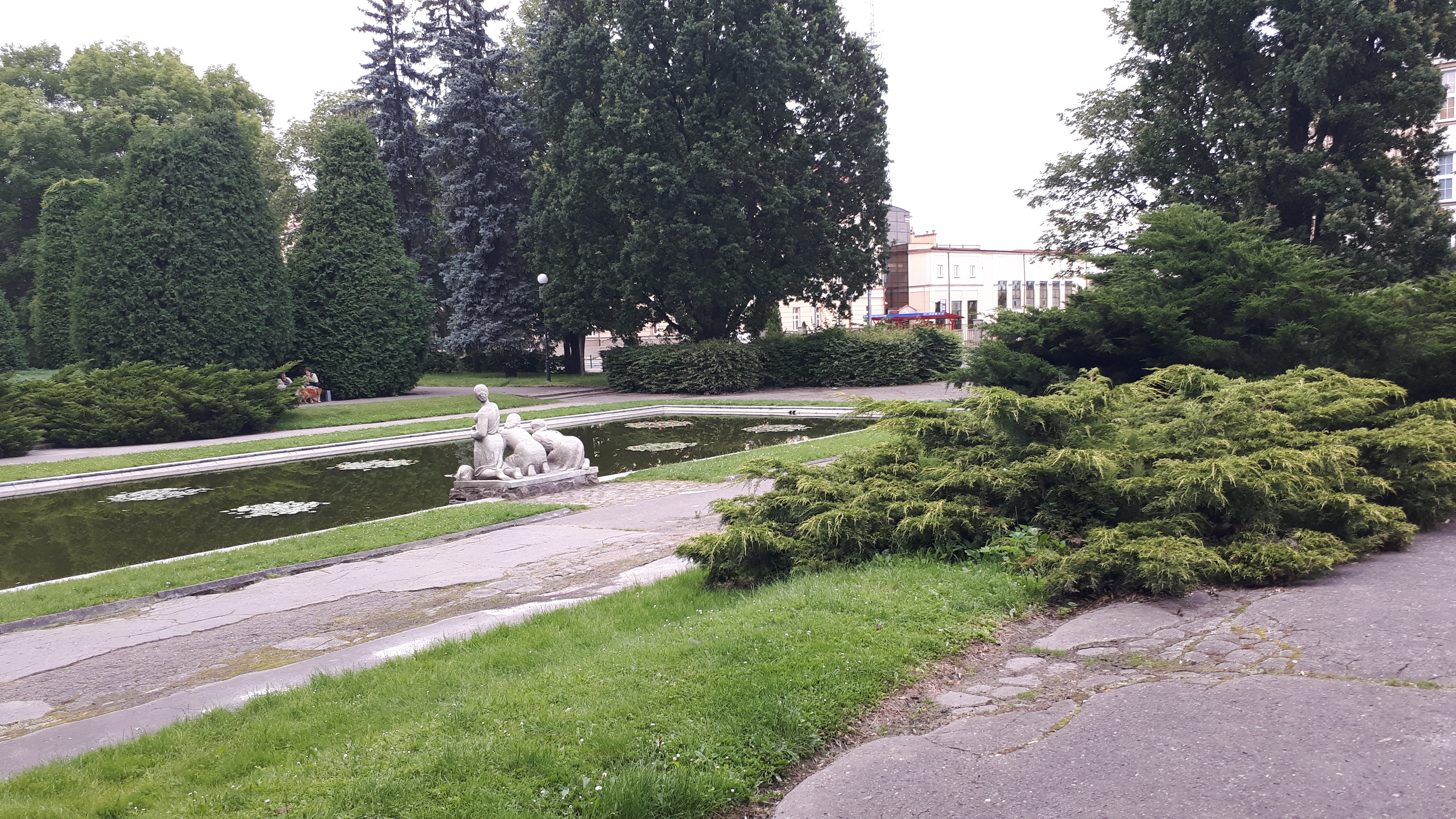
- Interactive map of Planty Park
- Type: Municipal
- Location: Białystok
- Coordinates: 53°07′37.29″N 23°10′0.5″E
- Area: 14.94 ha
- Established: 1938
- Status: Open all year

Planty Park is a city park in Białystok, capital of Podlaskie Voivodeship, with an area of 14.94 ha. It connects the Constitution of 3 May Park with the Poniatowski Park.

== History ==
In the 18th century, the area of the present Planty was occupied by the Branicki Fallow deer. In 1837 it was handed over to the Institute of Noble Maidens based in the palace. Until the end of the 19th century, orchards and meadows were located there, from which hay was obtained for the needs of the horse tram depot. The area became increasingly neglected over time, and after 1919, when Białystok became part of independent Poland it was left without a farmer or care.

Initially, the park was fenced with a wooden fence, and in the years 1908-1910 with a metal fence with three decorative gates, designed by Engineer Kołuby. This fence lasted until 1934. During the great economic crisis in 1932, on the initiative of the voivode of Białystok Voivodeship, Marian Zyndram-Kościałkowski who donated 28 hectares of state-owned land to the city, the design of a city park called Planty was started. This area is located between the present streets: Mickiewicza, Świętojańska, Akademicka and Legionowa. The author and implementer of the project was Stanisław Grala who from 1934 head of the Municipal Plantations department, with whom Józef Blicharski, a teacher of drawing at the Białystok Teachers Seminary, then collaborated on their establishment. In line with the modernist design, pedestrian alleys began to be created rapidly in 1934. It has a rich and varied green cover, separated by an irregular network of roads and alleys. One of the two fountains provided in the contract between the city and the waterworks and a restaurant pavilion were built in the park.

In the eastern part of the park, there is a rose with a regular layout of quarters, arranged on 4 levels. On the lowest level, a rectangular pool was built, next to which, before 1938, a sculpture of the "Washerwomen" by Stanisław Horno-Popławski was erected in 1945. Within two years, leveling works were carried out, new alleys were marked out, about 600 trees of 34 species were planted, original lanterns and cast-iron benches were installed. In 1951, a monument of gratitude to the Red Army was erected on the main axis of the alley, which in 1990 was moved to the Cemetery for Soviet soldiers at Ciołkowskiego Street. In the park there is also a sculpture by Małgorzata Niedzielko, "Kawelin Dog".

== Overview ==
Planty park is a compilation of a geometric French style and a free, natural landscape layout. A wide promenade with floral carpet floors runs through the park. In the center there is a rectangular pool with a fountain. At Mickiewicza Street vis à vis the Tax Chamber and the Female Gymnasium Anna Jabłonowska née Sapieha, a rose garden was created. These are tunnels made of climbing roses, rows of box trees, gates overgrown with plants - places that arouse the admiration of the city residents and visitors.

The most valuable trees in the park are: English oaks (Quercus robur), hornbeams (Carpinus betulus), Norway maples (Acer platanoides), pines, Norway spruces (Picea abies), and warty birches (Betula pendula). Elder bushes (Sambucus) and rose hips (Rosa canina) can be distinguished. In the park there are common squirrels (Sciurus vulgaris), woodpeckers (Picidae), House sparrows (Passer domesticus), and great tit (Parus major).
