= Józef Karol Puchalski =

Polish politician

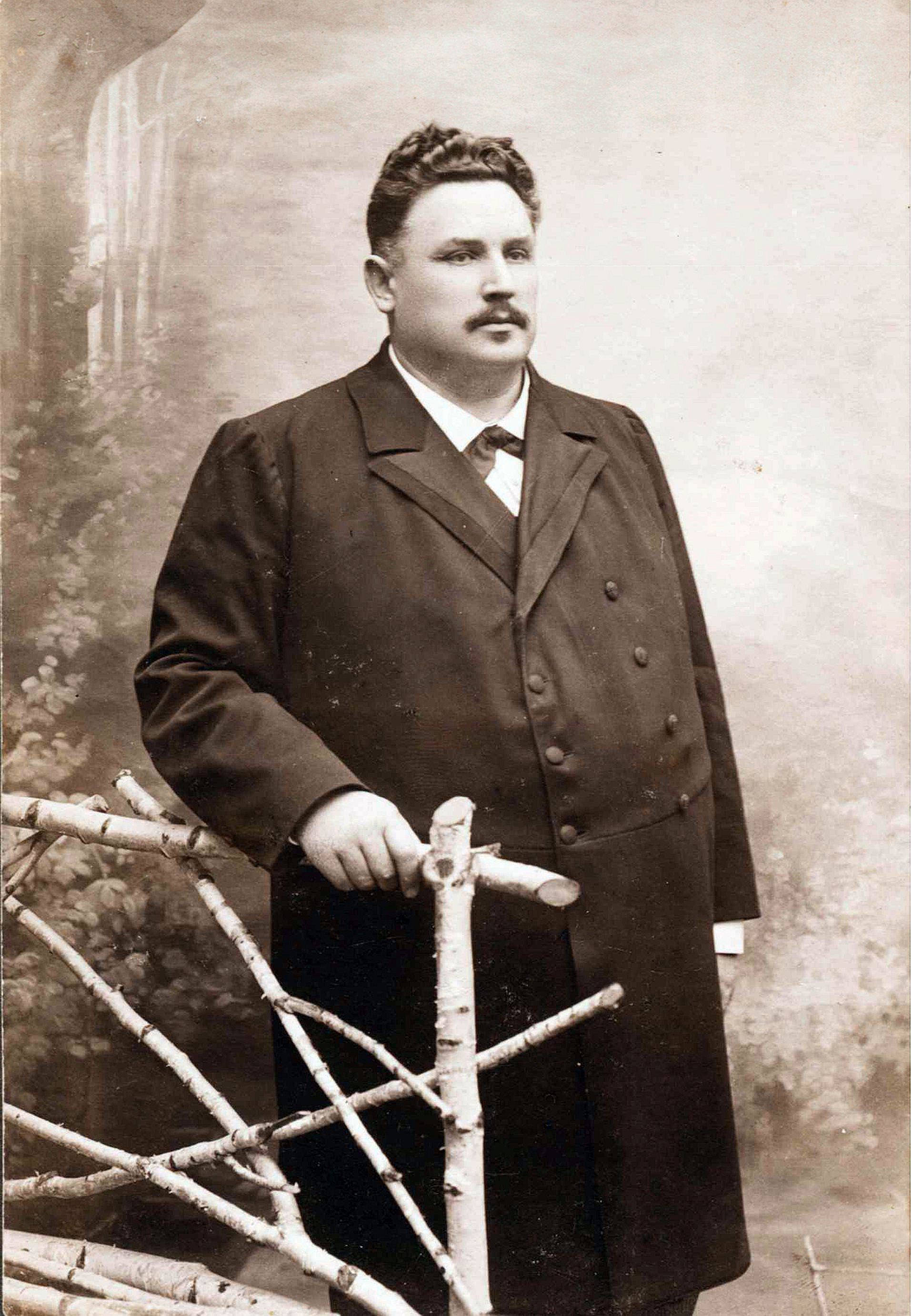

Mayor of Białystok
- In office February 1919 – September 1919
- Preceded by: Vladimir Dyakov
- Succeeded by: Bolesław Szymański

Member of the Białystok City Council
- In office 1904–1924

Personal details
- Born: 1862 Hermanówka estate, Belostoksky Uyezd
- Died: 15 September 1924 (aged 61–62)
- Resting place: Farny Cemetery
- Party: Polish Electoral Committee
- Spouse: Stanisława Puchalska

Józef Karol Puchalski (1862 - 15 September 1924) was a Polish local government politician who served as councillor of the Białystok City Council and later the first president of the city following the independence of Poland.

== Biography ==
He was born in the Hermanówka estate near Białystok. He was the co-founder of the Credit Society of the City of Białystok In 1904 he became a member of the Białystok City Council when the city was still part of the Russian Empire. Following the regaining of independence by Poland and the adjoining of Białystok to the newly formed Second Polish Republic, he became the first chairman of the temporary city committee Following the local elections held on September that year in which he ran on Polish Electoral Committee (Polish: Polski Komitet Wyborczy) list he became the first chairman of the Temporary Municipal Committee (de-facto mayor), holding this position for seven months. His tenure was characterized by enormous problems and he was often blamed as an indecisive politician acting on behalf of powerful influence groups. The lack of competence and commitment, the fruitless discussions and disputes, and the inability to obtain financing were emphasized. The work of Puchalski and his colleagues to date was harshly summarized. Puchalski's inability to maintain discipline in the proceedings was also criticized. Meetings usually started with a significant delay and were protracted. When any constructive motions were brought forward during the proceedings, Puchalski himself suppressed them.

Following the local government election held in September that year, he was succeeded by Bolesław Szymański.

The order of candidates on the Polish Electoral Committee (Polish: Polski Komitet Wyborczy) led by Puchalski to the September 1919 local election was determined during an internal vote. Of the 63 candidates, Feliks Filipowicz received the most votes (122). Józef Puchalski, receiving only 26 votes, finished second to last. The elections on September 7 brought a decisive victory for the Polish Committee. Thirty-five of its candidates were elected to the 42-member city council. Due to his poor results, Józef Puchalski was not among the councilors, and Boleslaw Szymanski replaced him as city mayor. He kept his position as a city councillor and concurrently served as vice-president. He was placed on a reserve list of candidates. However, following the resignation of several elected representatives, he was soon co-opted to the council. During Puchalski's absence his duties were assumed by Stanisław Parafianowicz. He also chaired the first meeting of the city council, which took place on October 15, 1919, at the Ritz Hotel. Inaugurating the meeting, government commissioner Napoleon Cydzik delivered a lengthy speech in which he made no mention of Józef Puchalski. At the same meeting, Bolesław Szymański was elected the new mayor of the city.

Puchalski returned to Białystok at the end of October 1919. His position in the new local government system was clearly marginalized. In the city council, the main roles, besides Feliks Filipowicz, were played by Puchalski's former colleagues from the Provisional City Committee: Bohdan Ostromęcki, Władysław Olszyński and Stanisław Parafianowicz. During the meetings, the former mayor was not very active until his death in 1924.

He was the owner of two tenement houses. He lived in a tenement house on Świętojańska Street. Puchalski's work in city government, however, began to be hampered by his health. It deteriorated significantly in early September 1924. On September 15, local doctors Izydor Wolf, Bolesław Knapiński, and Borys Gurwicz were summoned to his home at 21 Świętojańska Street for a consultation. Being in critical condition, Józef Puchalski died at 17:30 PM. His posthumous memoir stated that he was "known throughout Białystok for his work in local government, social affairs, and economics. A true Polish patriot". He was buried in the Farny Cemetery in the city.

He was married to Stanisława who was deported to the Soviet Union and died in the Kazakh SSR. Their son, Ryszard, played a significant role in Białystok's public life. In the second half of the 1930s, he became president of the Christian Association of Real Estate Owners. He published press polemics regarding city budget. Following the local elections in May 1939, he became a city councilor. In 1939, the president's widow, Stanisława Puchalski, was arrested by the NKVD and deported to Kazakhstan, where she died in 1941. Ryszard Puchalski, imprisoned in Kozelsk, perished in 1940.
