= Bolesław Szymański (politician) =

Polish politician

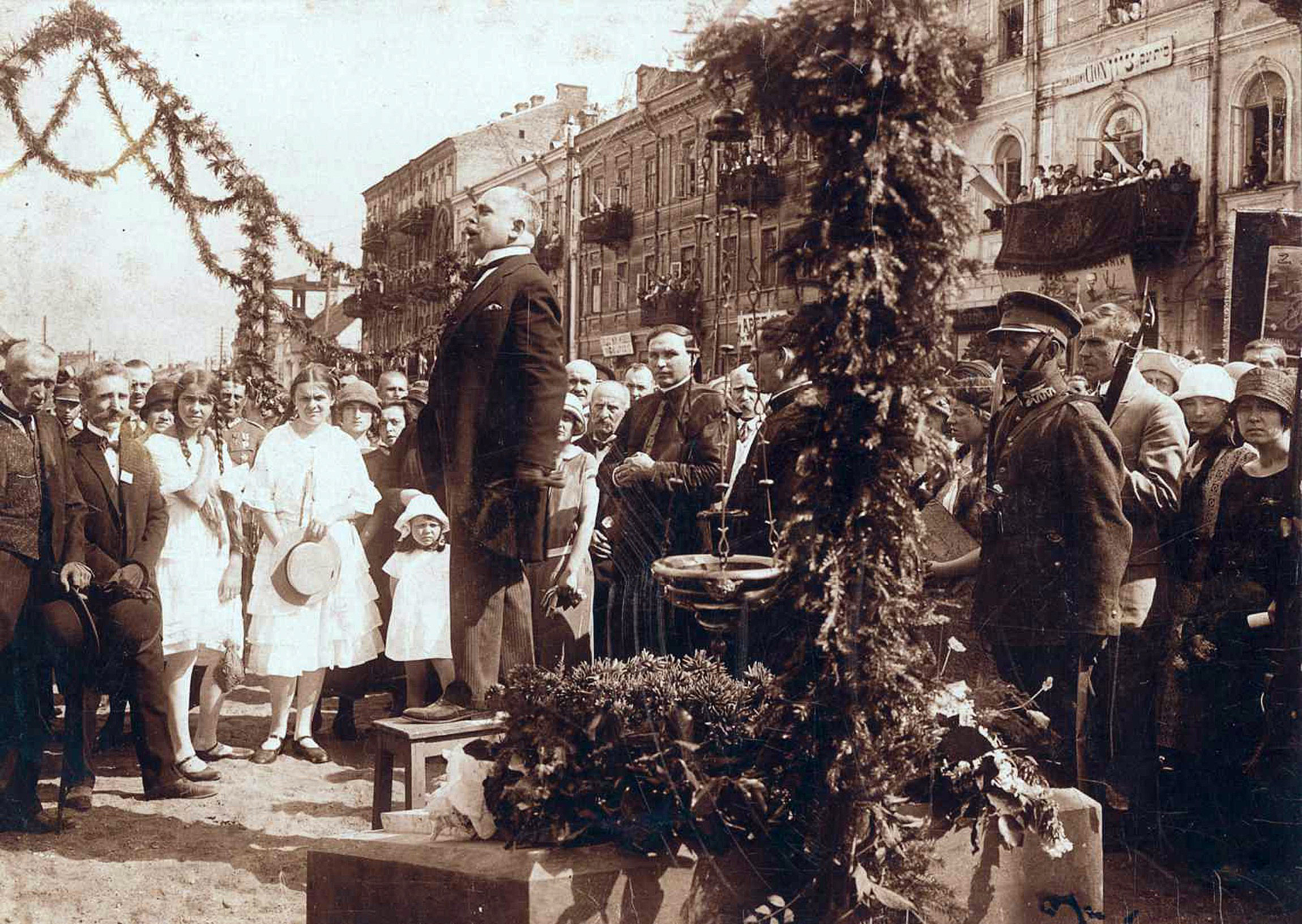
- Szymański gives a speech on the 3 May Constitution Day

Mayor of Białystok
- In office 15 October 1919 – 26 January 1928
- Preceded by: Józef Karol Puchalski
- Succeeded by: Michał Ostrowski

Personal details
- Born: 1877 Brest Litovsk, Russian Empire
- Died: 1940 (aged 62–63)
- Resting place: Unknown
- Party: Union of the Polish Electoral Committee
- Spouse: Maria Szymańska
- Children: Janusz, Halina

Military service
- Branch/service: Imperial Russian Army

Bolesław Szymański (1877 - 1940) was a local government politician who served as mayor of Białystok from 1919 to 1928.

== Biography ==
He was born in 1877 in Brest Litovsk. At some point he and his family moved to Białystok to a house located at 30 Starobojarska street in the Bojary district of the city. In 1905, he got involved in the organization of the Muza Society and performs in a staging of Pan Tadeusz and in 1908 he worked for one year as a teach at the School of Commerce. After that he left with his wife to Smolensk, and then to Livny, Oryol Governorate, working as an official and banker. In 1915 returned to Białystok, and was mobilized into the Tsarist army and returned to Białystok at the turn of 1918 and 1919. Following the regaining of independence and the establishment of the Second Polish Republic he occupied the prominent position of deputy government commissioner of the eastern territories.

After arriving in Białystok and regaining independence in February 1919, he took over as deputy to A. Cyfrowicz, the government commissioner for the eastern territories. This position was equivalent to that of deputy starosta. From that moment on, Szymański began to effectively build his authority in the local community. He was soon perceived as "a Białystok resident distinguished by great attachment to his hometown, extensive knowledge of economics and administration, energy, and a profound understanding of the city's needs". A consequence of his activities was his active participation in the run-up to the local elections scheduled for September 1919. He was one of the founders of the Polish Electoral Committee. Despite this, when the Committee's list of 63 candidates was being compiled, Szymański came in only 18th place, gaining 88 votes. He was preceded by Feliks Filipowicz, Władysław Olszyński, Wincenty Hermanowski, Konstanty Kosiński, Michał Motoszko, Bohdan Ostromęcki, Hieronim Liwerski, and Jadwiga Klimkiewiczowa, all well-known from their pre-war activities.

On 15 October 1919, he was elected by the Białystok City Council as the mayor following the first local election to the city council that took place on September 7 that year, in which he ran on Polish Electoral Committee (Polish: Polski Komitet Wyborczy) ticket. He held this position for two terms until 1927. He was valued positively as being energetic person, having extensive knowledge of the economy and administration. As the front of the Polish–Soviet War was approaching to the city, on 13 June 1920, the Citizens' Committee for National Defence (Polish: Obywatelski Komitet Obrony Narodowej) was established. Its presidium included Karol Tołłoczko, Władysław Kolendo, Kazimierz Riegert and Szymański himself. Additionally, he was given the authority to create a volunteer army by order of General Józef Haller. The last meeting of the Committee in Białystok took place on 27 July, a few hours before the Bolsheviks occupied the city. The next one took place in Wysokie Mazowieckie, from where the Committee left for Warsaw. On 18 September 1920 Szymański returned to the city.

A significant task facing the mayor was the organization of the office itself. During Puchalski's time, it consisted of five departments. Szymański created nine departments within the office structure, which also had specialized sections. The list of issues facing the officials, which Szymański articulated, was long. The most urgent needs were listed as the city's regulatory plan, establishing the boundaries of greater Białystok, a sewage system, repairing the pavements, launching trams, rebuilding the water supply system, creating a school network, building primary, vocational and secondary schools, constructing a whole series of buildings for state, military and municipal offices, building civil servants' colonies, a community center, and a theater. However, the main effort of the mayor and chairman of the city council had to be directed towards supplying the city with basic foodstuffs and fuel. During the winter months of 1919/1920, Szymański and Filipowicz traveled repeatedly, often every few days, to Warsaw, where, thanks to intervention with the central authorities, they secured shipments of coal, flour, eggs, sugar, potatoes and herring. Only thanks to their determination did the inhabitants barely survive the winter.

His later tenure was characterized by a growing criticism of his conduct and he was mocked by the press about his education. He had constant conflicts with members of the city council led by Władysław Olszyński. He was a political ally of Feliks Filipowicz, the chairman of the city council. During Józef Piłsudski's visit to the city in August 1921, he was staying at Szymański's residence in Bojary. After the end of his term he worked at the Białystok power plant until the outbreak of the war, holding the position of chief accountant.

In July 1922 serious floods damaged the city's infrastructure. The largest loss, estimated at 12 million marks, was suffered by the Jewish hospital on Warszawska Street. Just before the flood, a complete X-ray room purchased by an American organization was brought to Białystok. It was not yet operational when it was partially destroyed. The total loss was estimated at 38 million marks. Faced with this threat, Bolesław Szymański stepped aside, leaving the primary role to the voivode. The voivode in turn, collaborated not with the president but with Bolesław Rybałowicz. Despite this, Szymański did not come under criticism.

In the 1927 election to the city council he led the Union of the Polish Electoral Committee list.

He was married to Maria Dąbrowska (1888-1969) and had a son, Janusz, who died shortly after his birth and a daughter, Halina (1911-1981). In the autumn of 1939, he was deported to Siberia with his family. His symbolic grave is located at Powązki Cemetery in Warsaw.
