= Voivodeship Hospital in Białystok =

Voivodeship Hospital in Bialystok Wojewódzki Szpital Zespolony im. J. Śniadeckiego w Białymstoku
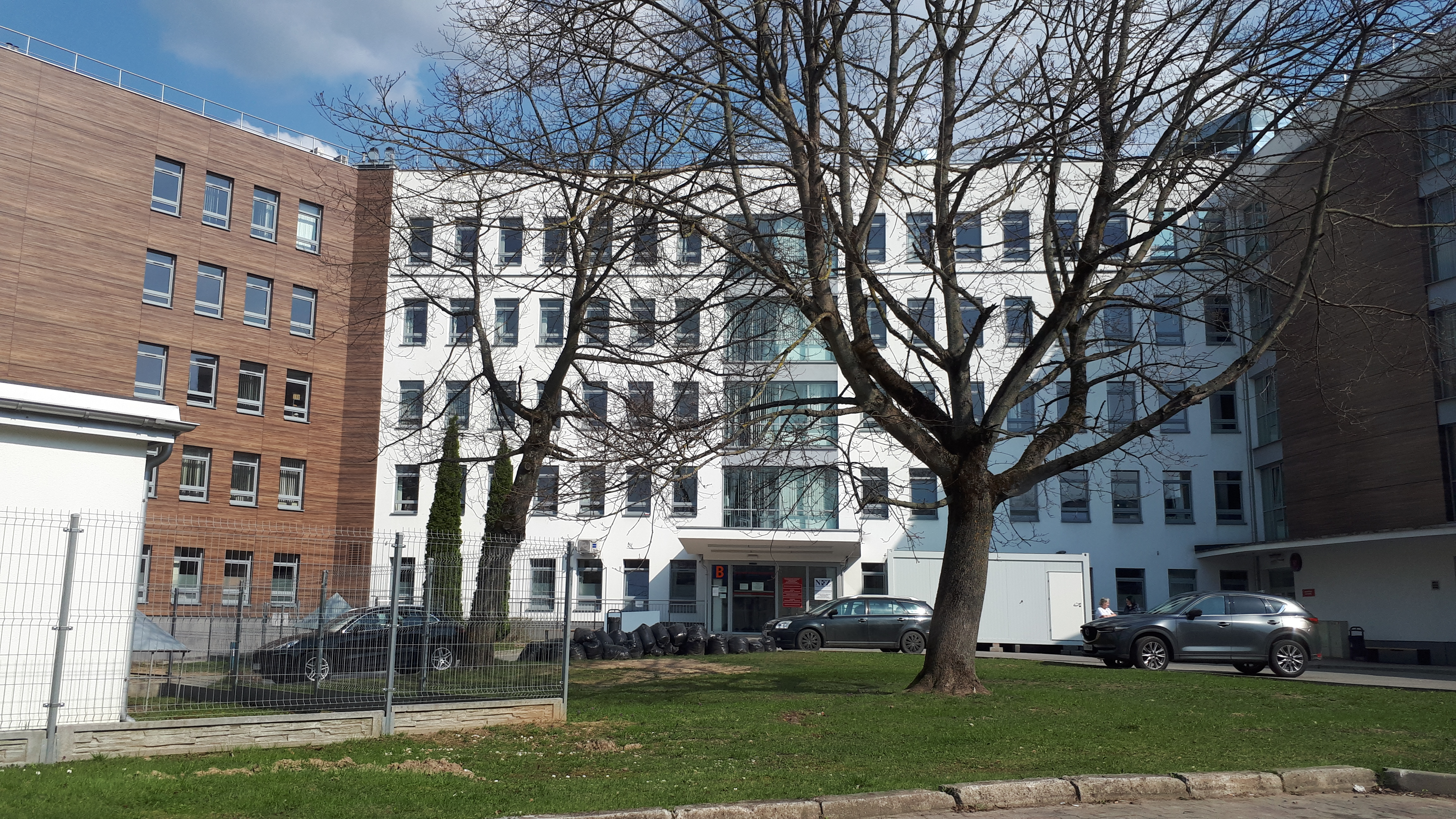

Geography
- Location: Białystok, Podlaskie Voivodeship, Poland
- Coordinates: 53.125483182°N 23.163479885°E

Organisation
- Care system: National Health Fund

Services
- Emergency department: Yes

Helipads
- Helipad: yes

History
- Founded: 1953

Links
- Website: http://www.sniadecja.pl
- Lists: Hospitals in Poland

Śniadeckiego Voivodeship Hospital in Bialystok (Polish: Samodzielny Publiczny Zakład Opieki Zdrowotnej Wojewódzki Szpital Zespolony im. J. Śniadeckiego w Białymstoku) is a general hospital in Białystok capital of Podlaskie Voivodeship in north-east Poland. It is under the jurisdiction of the Podlaskie Voivodeship Marshal's Office and is located in a complex of buildings in Skłodowskiej Street.

== History ==
Following the destruction of much infrastructure (among them sw. Rocha hospital) after the Second World War ended, a new building was built and commissioned in 1948 at Piwna Street (currently Skłodowskiej Street) intended for 180 patients. It received the name of the State Surgical Hospital. It had three operating rooms, diagnostic and radiological equipment and its own economic facilities, which it received entirely from the donations of UNRRA (like many other hospitals). At that time, the construction of a nursing school began on the square opposite. However, the original design was modernized and the facility was finally put into use in 1950 for the treatment of internal diseases and neurology. This is how the Municipal Internal Hospital was established (now 25 Słodowskiej street). At the request of the then Provincial Physician and the Rector of the Medical Academy, a resolution of the Presidium of the Provincial National Council issued on January 1, 1953, the Provincial Complex Hospital was established. J. Śniadeckiego. Thus, the Municipal Hospital of Internal Medicine and two children's pavilions and the State Surgical Hospital were merged into one administrative organization. A pavilion built in 1955 and intended for pediatric surgery (at 3 Wołodyjowskiego Street) was expanded and modernized and 1969, increasing the number of beds from 60 to 135. One of the physicians associated with the hospital in its formative years was Konrad Fiedorowicz (1878-1957) who was the Medical director of the hospital from its establishment until his death.

The commissioning of the State Clinical Hospital in 1962 and the transfer of some of the clinics to it significantly relieved the Voivodeship Hospital from teaching activities. In the years 1979–1981, additional floors and wings were added to the building, which housed internal departments. In the new rooms there are departments: cardiology, gastroenterology, rheumatology, two departments of internal diseases and two neurological diseases. Order 2/85 of the Voivode of Białystok Voivodeship, signed on 10th of January 1985 approved the statue of the hospital.

In January 1985, the department of computed tomography, angiography and ultrasound began operating. In the extension of the "Rotunda" wing, in 1992, a medical rehabilitation department with hydrotherapy was organized, next to the existing medical rehabilitation department, which is the first specialist department in the country to function in a provincial-level hospital and the first to be established in the north-eastern region of Poland. Pursuant to the Ordinance of the Voivode of Białystok, the Specialist Mother, Child and Youth Healthcare Team in Białystok was incorporated into the Provincial Integrated Hospital on January 1, 1992.

In 2014, a modernization and reconstruction began in the building in Skłodowskiej 25 and as a result, the so-called a rotunda, and in place of the old hospital infrastructure, a new, three-story building (No. 1 B) was built, and building No. 2 underwent a major renovation and reconstruction. In 2016 a major overhaul of the Ginekology department was completed. In 2020 the Pediatric department in the hospital passed a major renovation with a cost of 12 million Zloty, of which 9 million was financed by the European Union and 3 million from the Podlaskie Voivodeship Marshal's Office. In May 2021 it was announced that the hospital received PLN 8 million in subsidies from European funds for the renovation of oncology and general urology department and the orthopedic and trauma department with the renovation expected to finish by the end of 2022. It was further announced that a histopathology and cytology laboratory will be established.
