= 1938–39 Polish local elections =

The 1938–1939 Polish local elections were the last series of elections for local governments in the Second Polish Republic. They were likely held only in 40% of gminas and the majority of gromadas and cities, in the latter they were held largely on 18 December 1938. The majority of seats were earned by the Camp of National Unity alongside independents. According to Hubert Izdebski, the elections were held in a much better atmosphere than the previous local elections. Turnout reached 63,8%.

The elections were held according to the ordinance o wyborze radnych miejskich oraz o wyborze radnych gromadzkich, gminnych i powiatowych from 16 August 1938. The elections to gromada, gmina and undesignated town councils were managed by starostas. Voivodes managed elections over powiat councils and designated towns, whereas the Minister of Interior Affairs managed the elections in Warsaw (first since 1927).

== Results ==
=== City councils ===
The total results for city council elections, based on 564 out of 604 existing cities, are as follows:

Party	Seats	
Party	#	%
Camp of National Unity and allies	4 832	48,1
Jewish lists	1 737	17,3
National Party	1 595	15,9
Polish Socialist Party	1 069	10,6
Ukrainian lists	332	3,3
Labour Faction	186	1,9
People's Party	136	1,4
German lists	70	0,7
Regional lists	48	0,5
Belarusian lists	27	0,3
Others	8	0,1
Total	10 040	100

=== Gromada councils ===
In 39 265 gromadas, 517 936 councillors were elected:

Party	Seats	
Party	#	%
Camp of National Unity	299 082	57,7
People's Party	54 021	10,4
Ukrainian lists	53 333	10,3
Regional lists	41 915	8,1
National Party	31 617	6,1
German lists	11 524	2,2
Polish Socialist Party	6 255	1,2
Belarusian lists	6 200	1,2
Labour Faction	4 659	0,9
Jewish lists	3 087	0,6
Others	6 243	1,2
Total	517 936	100

=== Gmina councils ===
In 1 246 gminas, 20 284 councillors were elected:

Party	Seats	
Party	#	%
Camp of National Unity	14 704	72,5
People's Party	2 388	11,8
National Party	1 356	6,7
Regional lists	983	4,8
Belarusian lists	303	1,5
Polish Socialist Party	224	1,1
German lists	178	0,9
Jewish lists	58	0,3
Ukrainian lists	46	0,2
Labour Faction	3	0,0
Others	39	0,2
Total	20 282	100
