= Samochowiec =

Samochowiec is a Polish surname. Notable people with the surname include:

- Jerzy Samochowiec (fl. from 1991), Polish psychiatrist
- Leonidas Samochowiec (1923–2006), Polish pharmacologist
