= Tomasz K. Wojdacz =

Polish epigenetics scientist

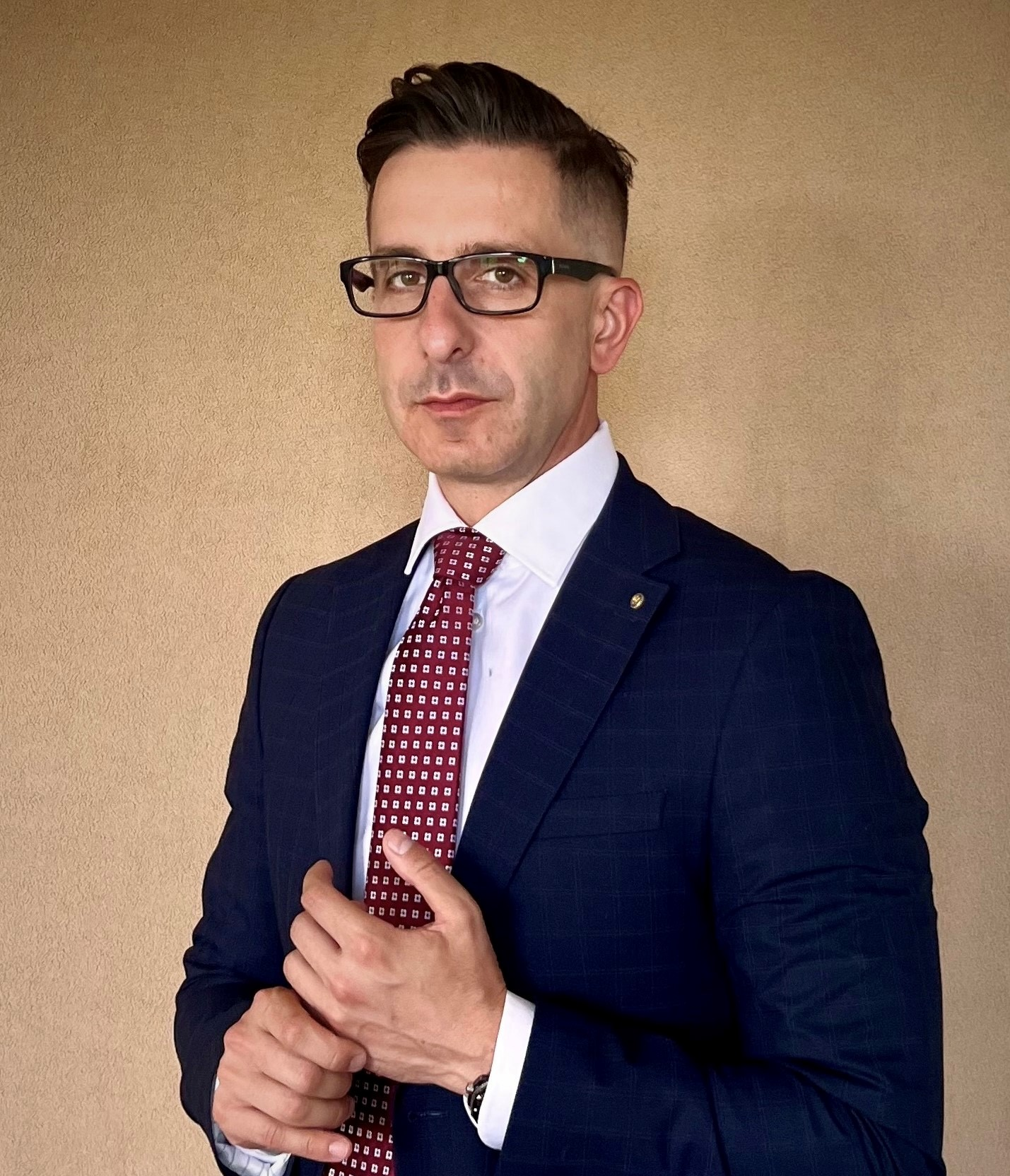
- Tomasz K. Wojdacz
- Born: July 21, 1980 (age 46); Jasło, Poland
- Known for: Clinical epigenetics, DNA methylation, biomarkers
- Awards: Marie Skłodowska-Curie Fellowship; Lundbeck Foundation Talent Prize

Academic background
- Education: University of Silesia in Katowice, Aarhus University, Kozminski University

Academic work
- Discipline: Epigenetics, Clinical epigenetics
- Institutions: Aarhus University, Pomeranian Medical University in Szczecin, Medical University of Bialystok

Tomasz Kazimierz Wojdacz (born 21 July 1980) is a Polish scientist specializing in epigenetics and clinical epigenetics, professor of medical sciences, and president of the International Society for Molecular and Clinical Epigenetics (isMOCLEP). He serves as an section editor for the journal Clinical Epigenetics, published by Springer Nature.

== Education and academic career ==
Wojdacz earned a master's degree in biology from the University of Silesia in Katowice and later completed an MBA at Kozminski University. He received his PhD in medicine from Aarhus University in Denmark in 2010. Prior to his doctoral studies, he conducted research at the Peter MacCallum Cancer Centre in Melbourne, Australia.

He completed postdoctoral fellowships at the Karolinska Institute in Sweden, the University of Southampton in the United Kingdom, and the Aarhus Institute of Advanced Studies (AIAS) in Denmark, where he held an EU Marie Skłodowska-Curie Fellowship funded through the Horizon 2020 COFUND programme.

In 2019, Wojdacz obtained his habilitation at the Pomeranian Medical University in Szczecin. That same year, he established the Independent Clinical Epigenetics Laboratory at Pomeranian Medical University. In 2026, he was appointed Head of the Department of Clinical Epigenomics at the Medical University of Bialystok.

He was a professor at Aarhus University from 2014 to 2025 and at Pomeranian Medical University from 2019 to 2026. In June 2026, he was awarded the title of Professor of Medical and Health Sciences (M.P. z 2026 r. poz. 705).

== Research and commercialization ==
Wojdacz's research focuses on clinical epigenetics, particularly translational cancer research, DNA methylation, and precision medicine. He developed methylation detection technology that was subsequently commercialized through spin-off initiatives. He co-founded the biotechnology spin-out company MethylDetect ApS based on intellectual property developed during his academic research.

== Professional activities ==
Wojdacz is a co-founder and current president of the International Society for Molecular and Clinical Epigenetics (isMOCLEP) . The society organises the annual Clinical Epigenetics International Conference (CLEPIC).

== Awards and honors ==
- Marie Skłodowska-Curie Fellowship (Aarhus Institute of Advanced Studies / European Commission).
- Lundbeck Foundation Talent Prize (2010), awarded for scientific achievements before the age of 30.
- Reinholdt W. Jorck og Hustrus Fond Prize (2009), recognizing achievements in the commercialization of scientific research.
