= Dominika Dudek =

Polish psychiatrist (born 1969)

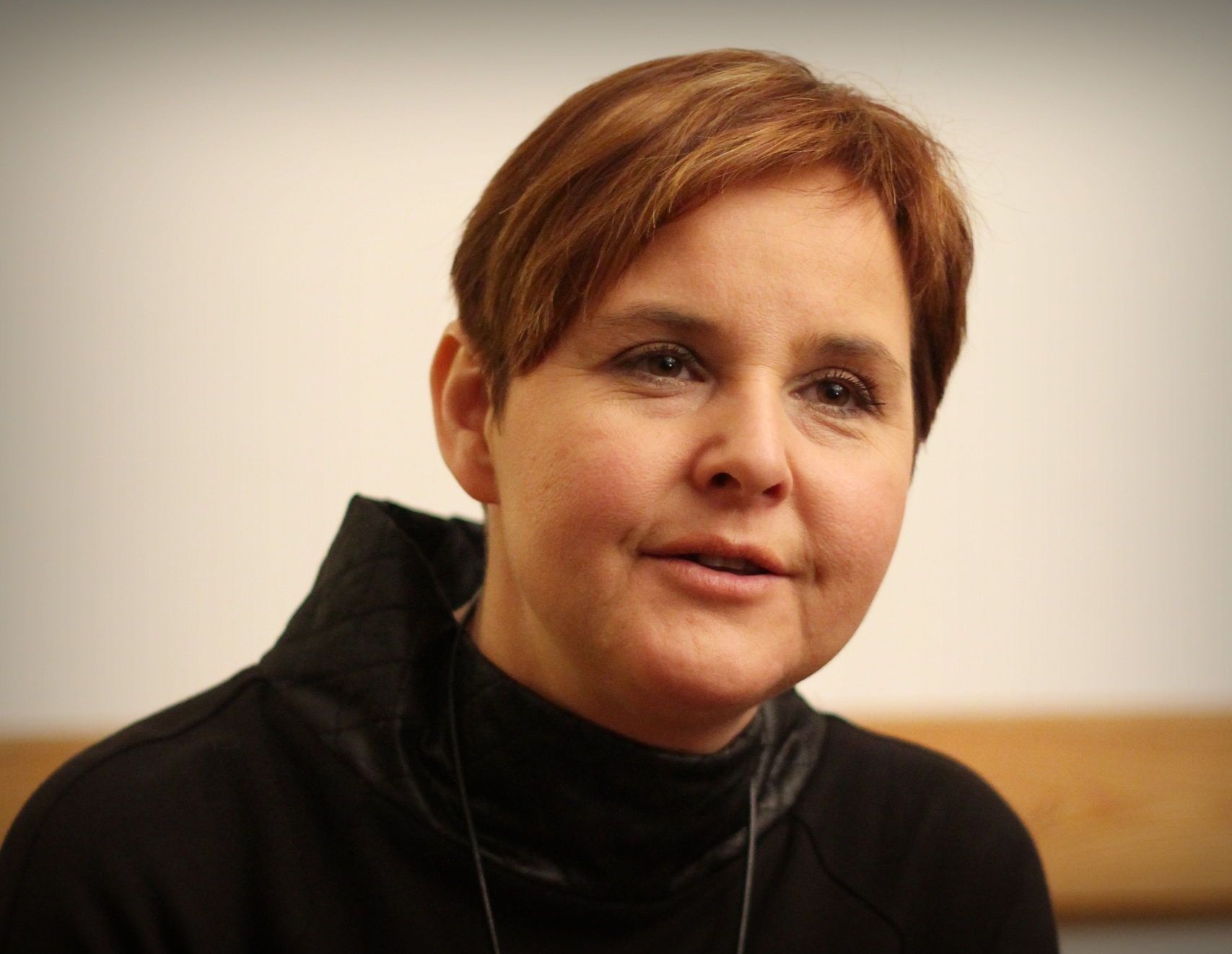
- Dominika Dudek in 2014
- Born: 2 July 1969 (age 57)
- Scientific career
- Fields: psychiatry
- Doctoral advisor: Andrzej Zięba

Dominika Dudek (born 2 July 1969) is a psychiatrist, specialist in clinical psychiatry, depressive disorders and bipolar disorder, Head of the Department of Psychiatry and the Clinic of Adult Psychiatry at the Jagiellonian University Medical College, professor of medical sciences, since 2013 editor-in-chief of the journal “Psychiatria Polska”, between 2022 and 2025 the president of the Polish Psychiatric Association.

== Biography ==
The daughter of cardiologist Jacek Dubiel. In 1993 she graduated from the Jagiellonian University Medical College. There in 1998 she obtained a doctorate in medical sciences based on her dissertation Spostrzeganie relacji małżeńskich przez pacjentów depresyjnych i ich współmałżonków w aspekcie stylu poznawczego (Perception of marital relationships by depressive patients and their spouses in terms of cognitive style), supervised by Andrzej Zięba. In 2006 she obtained habilitation, and in 2012 she obtained title of professor. Between 2010 and 2014 she was employed at the Institute of Pharmacology of the Polish Academy of Sciences. She co-organized a scientific conference cicle Pharmacotherapy, Psychotherapy and Rehabilitation of Affective Disorders (Polish: Farmakoterapia, Psychoterapia i Rehabilitacja Zaburzeń Afektywnych), twenty two editions until 2017; as well as a series of popular lectures and discussions Conversations about human (Rozmowy o człowieku).

In June 2020 she authored a letter to president Andrzej Duda against the discrimination of LGBT people that was signed by several hundreds scientists. In November 2025, she was appointed by the Mayor of Kraków, Aleksander Miszalski, as the chairwoman of the Kraków Mental Health Council.

She was married to Dariusz Dudek. In December 2015, Central Anticorruption Bureau searched her house and cabinet.

== Books ==
=== Editions ===
- Choroba afektywna dwubiegunowa – wyzwania diagnostyczne. 2002. Co-edited with Janusz Rybakowski and Marcin Siwkek.
- Najnowsze techniki neuromodulacyjne w terapii zaburzeń depresyjnych. 2009. Co-edited with Tomasz Zyss and Andrzej Zięba.
- Zaburzenia psychiczne w chorobach somatycznych. Praktyczne wskazówki diagnostyczne i terapeutyczne. 2009. Co-edited with Joanna Rymaszewska.
- Depresja. Wiedzieć aby pomóc. 2010. Co-edited with Andrzej Zięba.
- Ból i depresja. 2011. Edited by.
- Psychiatria na obcasach. 2014. Co-edited with Joanna Rymaszewska.

=== Book interviews ===
- Nie tylko mózg. Opowieść psychiatry o ludzkim umyśle. 2020. With Maria Mazurek.
- Sztuka obsługi życia. O fobiach, nadziejach i całym tym chaosie. 2021. With Bogdan de Barbaro and Piotr Żak.
