= Andrzej Cechnicki =

Polish psychiatrist

- Andrzej Cechnicki, 2023
- Occupation: Psychiatrist

Academic background
- Doctoral advisor: Jacek Bomba

Andrzej Cechnicki is a psychiatrist and psychotherapist, member of the presidium of the Polish Psychiatric Association.

== Biography ==
In 1974 he graduated from the Medical Academy in Kraków. In 1992 he obtained doctorate from the Jagiellonian University upon dissertation supervised by Jacek Bomba. In 2012 he obtained habilitation. He was appointed Head of the Center for Community Psychiatry and Psychosis Research at the Department of Psychiatry at the Jagiellonian University Medical College in Kraków.

== Books ==
- Schizofrenia – proces wielowymiarowy. Krakowskie prospektywne badania przebiegu, prognozy i wyników leczenia. 2011.
