= Maria Mazurek =

Polish journalist and writer (born 1987)

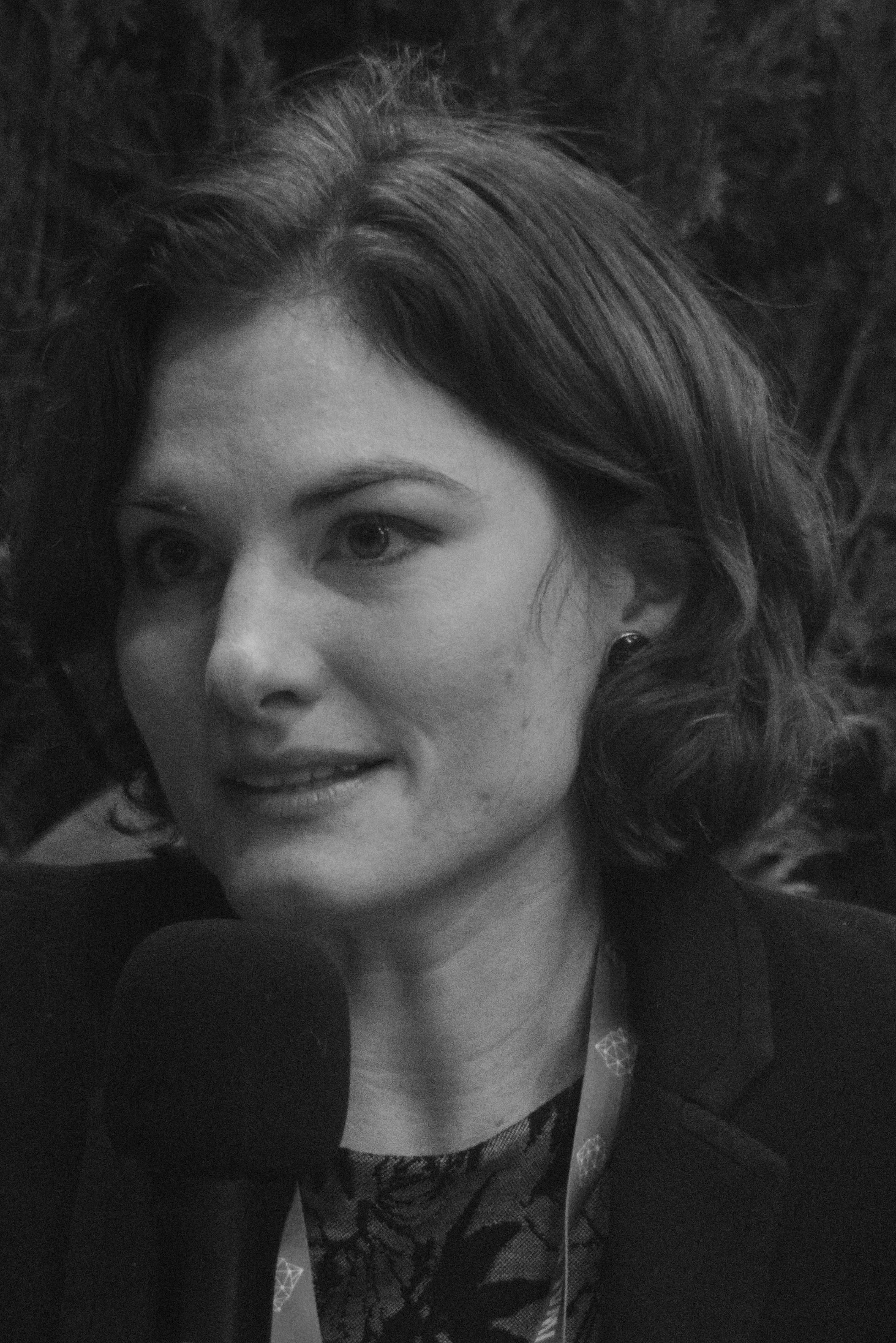
- Maria Mazurek, 2022
- Citizenship: Polish
- Occupations: journalist, writer

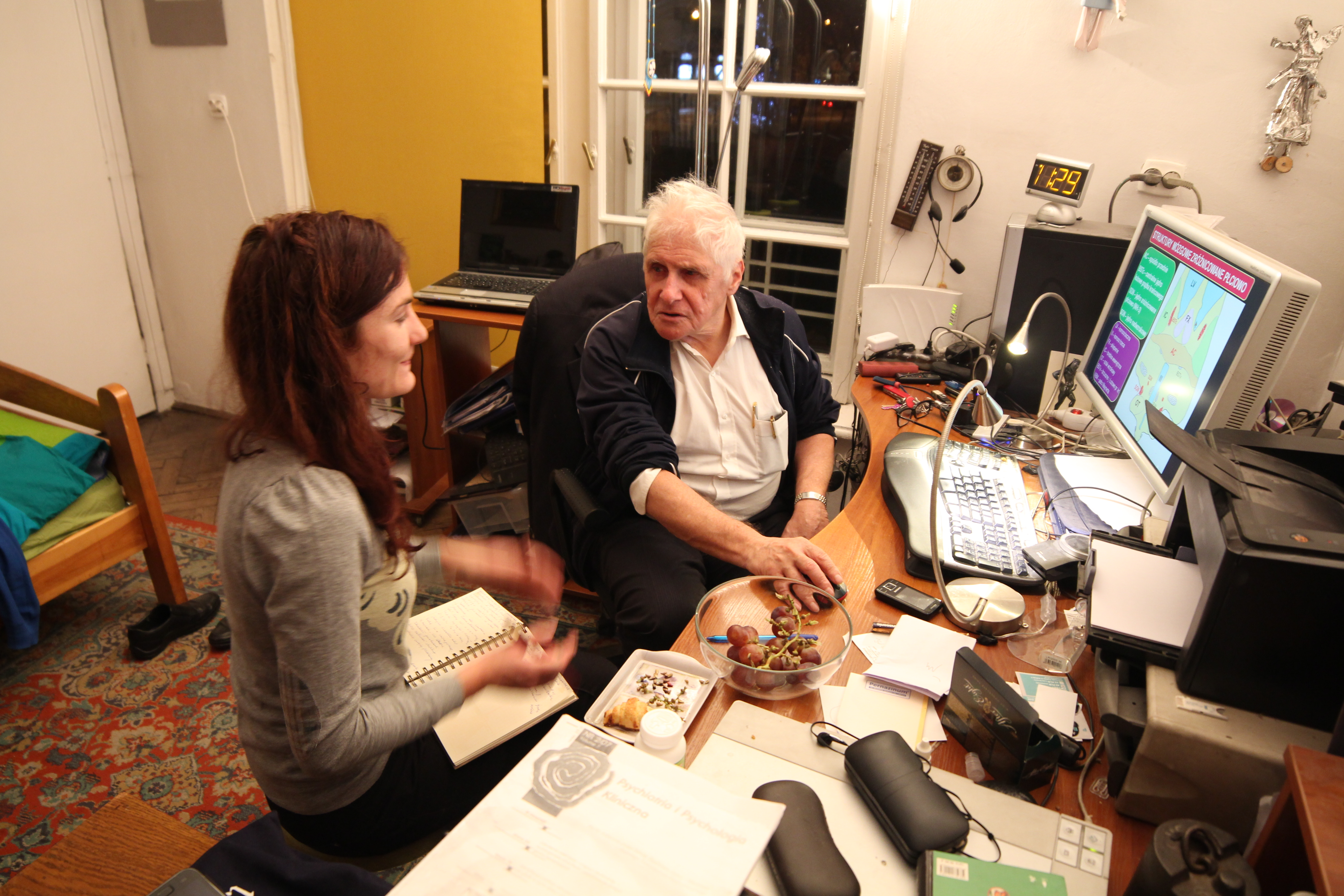
Maria Mazurek (left) with Jerzy Vetulani, 2014

Maria Mazurek (born 1987) is a journalist and writer.

== Biography ==
She published in Gazeta Krakowska and co-authored four books with Jerzy Vetulani. She suffers from rheumatoid arthritis.

== Books ==
- Bez ograniczeń. Jak rządzi nami mózg. Wydawnictwo Naukowe PWN. 2015. Co-authored with Jerzy Vetulani.
- A w konopiach strach. Wydawnictwo Naukowe PWN. 2016. Co-authored with Jerzy Vetulani.
- Pierwszy Murzyn RP. WAM. 2016. Co-authored with Brian Scott.
- Sen Alicji, czyli jak działa mózg. Mando. 2017. Co-authored with Jerzy Vetulani, illustrated by Marcin Wierzchowski.
- Neuroerotyka. Rozmowy o seksie i nie tylko. Znak. 2018. Co-authored with Jerzy Vetulani.
- Alicja w krainie przyszłości, czyli jak działa sztuczna inteligencja. Mando. 2019. Co-authored with Ryszard Tadeusiewicz, illustrated by Marcin Wierzchowski.
- Nie tylko mózg. Opowieść psychiatry o ludzkim umyśle. Mando. 2020. Co-authored with Dominika Dudek.
- Uczucia Alicji, czyli jak poznać siebie. Mando. 2020. Co-authored with Ewa Woydyłło-Osiatyńska, illustrated by Marcin Wierzchowski.
- Nad życie. Czego uczą nas umierający. Znak. 2021. Co-authored with Wojciech Harpula.
- Brzuch Alicji czyli kupa prawdy o trawieniu. Mando. 2022. Co-authored with Mikołaj Sporadyk, illustrated by Marcin Wierzchowski.
- Panie przodem. O co walczą kobiety i mężczyźni we współczesnej Polsce. Znak Literanova. 2023. Co-authored with Wojciech Harpula.
- Zbuntowane ciało. Jak zrozumieć i oswoić choroby autoimmunologiczne?. Filia. 2024.
- Moja przyjaciółka śmierć. Kulisy zawodu grabarza. Mando. 2024. Co-authored with Robert Konieczny.
- W głowie zabójcy. Pierwszy polski profiler kryminalny na tropie najgłośniejszych zbrodni. Wielka Litera. 2025. Co-authored with Maciej Szaszkiewicz.
- Pokochaj kobietę, którą jesteś. Zrozum siebie i bądź szczęśliwa. Wielka Litera. 2025. Co-authored with Ewa Mojs.

== Awards ==
- Nagroda Dziennikarzy Małopolski (Małopolska Journalists' Award, 2016) for a series of interviews with physicians.
- Zielona Gruszka (the "Green Pear" award, 2018) from the Board of the Kraków Branch of the Association of Journalists of the Republic of Poland for special journalistic achievements.
- Mądra Książka Roku (Smart Book of the Year award, 2018) for the best popular science book of the year for Sen Alicji, awarded by the Jagiellonian University and the Euclid Foundation for the Popularization of Science.
- Nomination for the Nagroda Dziennikarzy Małopolski (Małopolska Journalists' Award, 2018) in the specialist journalist category for four interviews with scientists from Kraków.
- Nagroda Dziennikarzy Małopolski (Małopolska Journalists' Award, 2019) in the specialist journalist category for a triptych devoted to dying.
