= Janusz Heitzman =

Polish psychiatrist (born 1952)

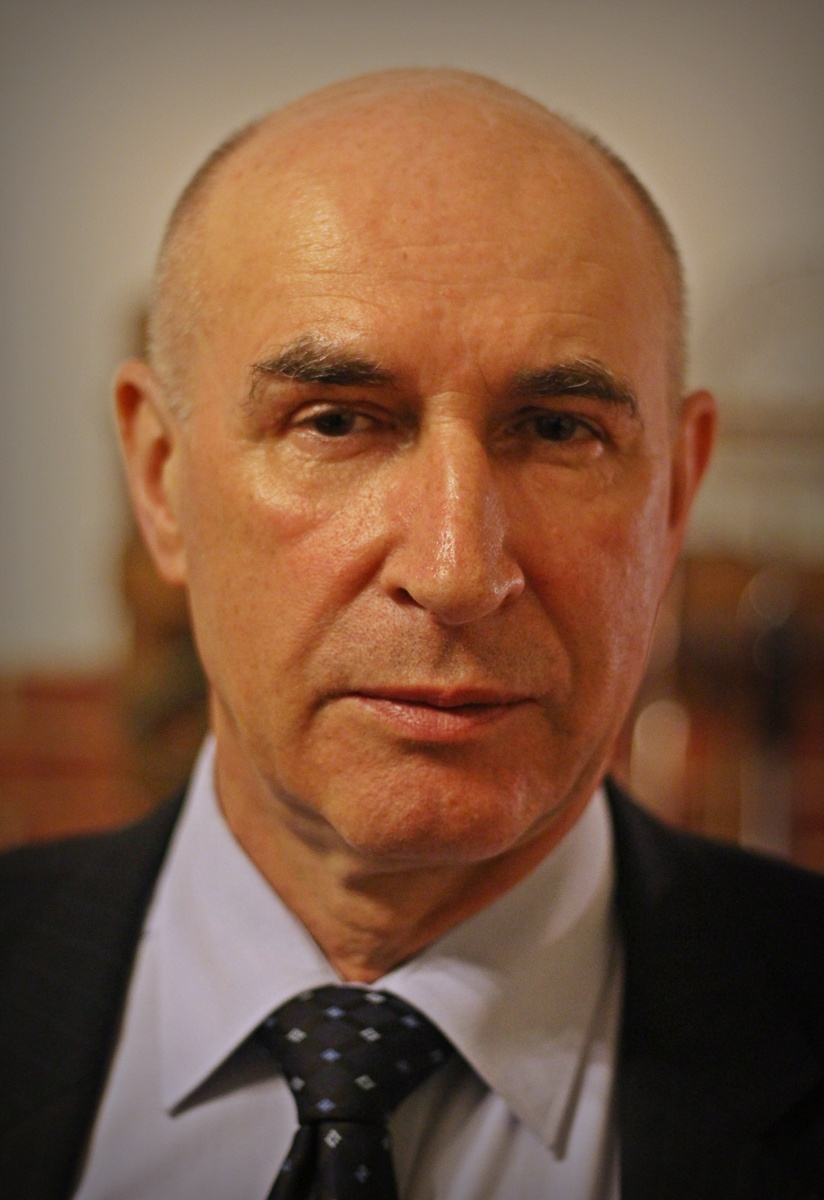
- Janusz Heitzman in 2014
- Born: 1952 (age 73–74)
- Scientific career
- Fields: psychiatry

Janusz Piotr Heitzman (born 1952) is a psychiatrist.

== Biography ==
He graduated from the Medical Academy in Kraków in 1977. In 1991 he obtained doctorate under the supervision of Zdzisław Jan Ryn. In 2003 he obtained habilitation. In 2021 he obtained the title of professor.

In 1979 he started work at the Medical Academy in Kraków, that was later transformed into the Jagiellonian University Medical College. He was the president of the Polish Psychiatric Association and was the director of Instytut Psychiatrii i Neurologii between 2016 and 2020. He was a member of Mental Health Council (Rada do spraw Zdrowia Psychicznego). From 5 February 2020 to 7 November November 2025 he held the office of the Plenipotentiary of the Minister of Health for forensic psychiatry. He became the Chairman of the Psychiatric Commission for Preventive Measures and a member of the inter-ministerial working group appointed to prepare a draft amendment to the Act on the National Centre for the Prevention of Dissocial Behaviour in Gostynin. As of November 2025, two of his former patients accused him of inappropriate behaviors.

== Books ==
- Psychiatria. Podręcznik dla studentów medycznych. Warszawa: Wydawnictwo Lekarskie PZWL. 2007. Co-authored and edited by.
- Farmakoterapia depresji – współczesne podstawy teoretyczne i doświadczenia kliniczne. Termedia. 2012. Co-edited with Jerzy Vetulani.
- Psychiatria w geriatrii. Termedia. 2018. ISBN 978-83-7988-223-6. Edited by.
