= Mary Osborn (disambiguation) =

Mary Osborn (born 1940) is an English cell biologist.

Mary Osborn or Osborne may also refer to:

- Mary Jane Osborn (1927–2019), American biochemist and molecular biologist
- Mary Osborne (1921–1992), American jazz guitarist and guitar manufacturer
- Mary Pope Osborne (born 1949), American author
- Mary Osborne, Duchess of Leeds (1723–1764), noblewoman
- Mary Osborn (murderer) (c. 1773–1801), the first woman to be executed in Upper Canada

== See also ==
- Mary Osbourne (born 1982), winner of the MTV reality television show Surf Girls
- Emily Mary Osborn (1828–1925), English painter of the Victorian era
- Mary Osburn Adkinson (1843–1918), née Osburn, American social reformer active in the temperance movement
- Mary Osborn Douthit (1850–1908), early white Oregon settler, teacher, and advocate of woman suffrage
