= Jacek Bomba =

Polish psychiatrist (born 1941)

- Born: 1941 (age 84–85)
- Citizenship: Polish
- Occupation: psychiatrist

Jacek Bomba (born 1941) is a psychiatrist, who was head of the Department of Psychiatry at the Faculty of Medicine of the Jagiellonian University Medical College and the president of the Polish Psychiatric Association.

== Biography ==
His teachers included Antoni Kępiński and Maria Orwid. He supervised eight doctoral dissertations, including doctoral dissertation of Andrzej Cechnicki.

== Books ==
- Leczenie anoreksji i bulimii psychicznej: co, kiedy, komu?. Polskie Towarzystwo Psychiatryczne. 2003. Together with Barbara Józefik.
- Być rodziną, czyli jak budować dobre życie swoje i swoich dzieci. Wydawnictwo Literackie. Part one 2003, part two 2004; together with Dorota Terakowska.
- Kim jesteśmy, czyli o seksie. Wydawnictwo Literackie. 2006. Together with Katarzyna Janowska.
- Ćwiczenia z myślenia i jedzenia. Austeria. 2024.
