= Agata Szulc =

Polish psychiatrist

- Citizenship: Polish
- Education: Medical Academy of Białystok
- Occupation: psychiatrist

Agata Anna Szulc is a psychiatrist, president of the Polish Psychiatric Association in 2016–2019 and again from 2025.

== Biography ==
In 1989 she graduated from the Medical Academy of Białystok. She started working at this academy in 1991. In 1997 she obtained her doctoral degree based on her thesis Wyniki badań tomografii komputerowej mózgu a obraz kliniczny schizofrenii written under the supervision of Zdzisław Falicki. In 2008 she obtained her habilitation based on the thesis Wpływ leków antypsychotycznych na funkcjonowanie mózgu w schizofrenii – ocena na podstawie badań spektroskopii protonowej rezonansu magentycznego. In 2008 she became the head of the Psychiatry Clinic at the Medical University of Białystok. In 2013 she obtained the title of professor of medical sciences. In October 2013, she started working at the Medical University of Warsaw as the head of the Psychiatric Clinic of the Faculty of Health Sciences.

In her scientific work, she has conducted neuroimaging studies, including magnetic resonance spectroscopy, in schizophrenia and bipolar disorder. She has studied biomarkers in mental disorders, including depression and schizophrenia. She has published approximately three hundred scientific publications, including several books. In 2019, she became a member of the Board of the European Psychiatric Association (EPA). She was a supervisor in fourteen doctoral dissertations.
