= Jerzy Samochowiec =

Polish psychiatrist

- Citizenship: Polish
- Education: Medical Academy in Szczecin
- Occupation: psychiatrist

Jerzy Samochowiec is a psychiatrist, since 2012 Vice-Rector for Science at the Pomeranian Medical University in Szczecin, in 2019–2022 President of the Polish Psychiatric Association.

== Biography ==
In 1991 he graduated from the Medical Academy of Szczecin. In 1993 he obtained a doctoral degree in medical sciences at the same university based on his thesis Udział ośrodkowego neuroprzekaźnictwa dopaminergicznego w rozwoju zależności od etanolu i przebiegu zespołu abstynencyjnego written under the supervision of Jan Horodnicki. In 1999 he obtained the degree of habilitated doctor based on his dissertation Molekularno-biologiczne mechanizmy zespołu zależności alkoholowej. In the years 1997–1999 he was a Humboldt scholar at the Psychiatric Clinic at the University of Berlin. He trained in psychotherapy in Kraków with Jerzy Aleksandrowicz.

In the years 2009–2013 he was a member of the board of the European Society for Biomedical Research on Alcoholism (ESBRA). In 2012, he became vice-rector for science at the Pomeranian Medical University in Szczecin. In the years 2015–2023 he was a member of the executive board of the European Psychiatric Association. In the years 2019–2022 he was the president of the Polish Psychiatric Association. Later he became its vice-president. He was the chairman of the Steering Committee of the Psychiatric Societies of the European Psychiatric Association.

He has published over three hundred review articles in Polish, English and German, particularly in the field of addiction genetics, depression, anxiety disorders, ADHD, pharmacogenetics of schizophrenia, deficit schizophrenia, psychotic episodes, high-risk states of psychosis, psychobiota. He became the editor-in-chief of the journal Archives of Psychiatry and Psychotherapy. He became a member of the editorial boards of journals Progress in Neuro-Psychopharmacology and Biological Psychiatry, Psychiatria Polska, Alkohol i Narkomania. He was the supervisor of nineteen doctoral dissertations.

== Books ==
- Molekularno-biologiczne mechanizmy zespołu zależności alkoholowej. Molecular mechanisms of the alcohol dependence syndrome. Aachen: Shaker. 1999.
