= Dariusz Dudek (cardiologist) =

Polish cardiologist (born 1969)

- Born: 1969 (age 56–57)
- Occupations: Cardiologist, cardiac surgeon

Academic background
- Education: Medical College of the Jagiellonian University
- Doctoral advisor: Aldona Dembińska-Kieć

Dariusz Zbigniew Dudek (born 1969) is a cardiologist and cardiac surgeon.

== Biography ==
In 1994 he graduated from the Medical College of the Jagiellonian University. In 1997 he obtained doctorate in medicine upon dissertation Rola indukowalnej syntazy tlenku azotu w doświadczalnej angioplastyce supervised by Aldona Dembińska-Kieć. In 2005 he obtained habilitation. He supervised eight doctoral dissertations.

He was married to Dominika Dudek.

== Books ==
- Torowana angioplastyka wieńcowa w leczeniu pacjentów ze świeżym zawałem serca z uniesieniem odcinka ST. Kraków: Wydawnictwo Uniwersytetu Jagiellońskiego. 2005. ISBN 83-233-1983-9. Habilitation thesis.
- Ostry zespół wieńcowy – jak leczyć skuteczniej i szybciej? Doustne leki przeciwpłytkowe. Poznań: Termedia Wydawnictwa Medyczne. 2006. ISBN 83-89825-55-4. Co-authored with Krzysztof Filipiak and Janina Stępińska.
