= Polish Psychiatric Association =

Scientific association

- Formation: 1920
- Leader: Agata Szulc
- Website: psychiatria.org.pl

Polish Psychiatric Association (Polish: Polskie Towarzystwo Psychiatryczne) is an association of psychiatrists in Warsaw established in 1920.

The Society published the following periodicals: “Rocznik Psychiatryczny” (since 1923), “Archives of Psychiatry and Psychotherapy” (since 1999), “Psychiatria i Psychoterapia” (since 2005), “Psychoterapia” and “Psychiatria Polska”.

Agata Szulc is its president, as of 16 November 2025.

== Presidents ==
- Witold Chodźko (1920–1923)
- Jan Mazurkiewicz (1923–1947)
- Józef Handelsman (1947–1953)
- Eugeniusz Wilczkowski (1954–1956)
- Zdzisław Jaroszewski (1957–1963)
- Andrzej Jus (1963–1969)
- Stanisław Dąbrowski (1969–1973)
- Leonard Wdowiak (1973–1976)
- Adam Szymusik (1976–1983)
- Andrzej Piotrowski (1983–1989)
- Jacek Bomba (1989–1995)
- Adam Bilikiewicz (1995–1998)
- Janusz Rybakowski (1998–2001)
- Jacek Bomba (2001–2004)
- Jacek Wciórka (2004–2007)
- Aleksander Araszkiewicz (2007–2010)
- Janusz Heitzman (2010–2013)
- Andrzej Rajewski (2013–2016)
- Bartosz Łoza (2016, he resigned from his position)
- Agata Szulc (2016–2019)
- Jerzy Samochowiec (2019–2022)
- Dominika Dudek (2022–2025)
- Agata Szulc (since 2025)

== Presidium members ==
- Andrzej Cechnicki

== Bibliography ==
- Bilikiewicz, Tadeusz; Gallus, Jan (1962). Psychiatria polska na tle dziejowym. Warszawa: Państwowy Zakład Wydawnictw Lekarskich. pp. 196–202.
