= Leonidas Samochowiec =

Polish pharmacologist and gynecologist (1923–2006)

- Born: 20 June 1923; Pohost (Pinsk district in Polesie)
- Died: 4 December 2006 (aged 83); Szczecin
- Citizenship: Polish
- Education: University of Łódź
- Occupations: pharmacologist, gynecologist

Leonidas Samochowiec (20 June 1923 – 4 December 2006), was a pharmacologist and gynecologist, dean of the Faculty of Pharmaceutical Sciences of the Medical University of Silesia from September until November 1972, director of the Institute of Pathology and Pharmacology at the Pomeranian Medical Academy.

== Biography ==
In 1941, he graduated from high school in Pinsk with matura and began working in the Chemical Laboratory of the local Municipal Hospital. In 1943, he was deported to forced labor, first to Wrocław, and later to Auerbach in Saxony.

In 1945, he returned to Poland and began his studies at the Faculty of Pharmacy of the University of Łódź, where he received his Master of Pharmacy degree in 1949. In 1952, he joined the Silesian Medical Academy (later Silesian Medical University) in Katowice, working in the Department of Pharmacology. At the same time, he began his studies at the Faculty of Medicine of the same university, where he obtained his medical degree in 1960. In 1961, he held a research scholarship at the Institute of Pharmacology of the Humboldt University in Berlin and at the Institute of Pharmacology of the German Academy of Sciences in Berlin-Buch.

In 1963, he transferred to the Pomeranian Medical Academy (later the Pomeranian Medical University) in Szczecin and became head of the Department of Pharmacology. That same year, he obtained his first-degree specialization in obstetrics and gynecology. In 1972, he was transferred to the Silesian Medical Academy, but later that same year, at his own request, he returned to the Szczecin Medical Academy. In 1974, he was awarded the title of associate professor, and in 1982, full professor. In 1977, he became director of the Institute of Pathology and Pharmacology at the Pomeranian Medical Academy (later transformed into the Institute of Pharmacology and Toxicology), where he worked until his retirement.

As a scientist, he initially focused on the pharmacodynamic properties of plants, later conducting research on atherosclerosis, and in the final period of his academic work, focused on experimental pharmacotherapy and toxicology. He authored several patents and developed the new drug "Cynarex" (used to prevent carbon disulfide poisoning). He published 35 scientific articles and student textbooks. He actively collaborated with numerous scientific societies, both domestic and international, particularly the Polish Pharmacological Society. Since 1961, he took part in scientific symposia, including in Helsinki, Edinburgh, Zurich, Milan, Chicago, San Diego, Tokyo, London, and Cambridge.

He was buried at the Doły cemetery in Łódź.

== Books ==
- Farmakoterapia wieku dziecięcego z uwzględnieniem terapii ogólnej. 1971, 1973, 1977. Co-author: Julia Starkiewiczowa.
- Farmakoterapia stomatologiczna. 1977.
- Receptura. 1988.
- Kompendium ziołolecznictwa. 1995.
- Kompendium farmakoterapii dla stomatologów. Wrocław: Elsevier Urban & Partner Wydawnictwo. 2001. ISBN 83-87944-87-4. Edition 2. Co-authors: Zbigniew Jańczuk, Jerzy Wójcicki.

== Awards ==
- Honorary doctor of the Pomeranian Medical University (1995).
- Odznaka Honorowa Gryfa Pomorskiego.
- Knight's Cross of Polonia Restituta.
- Zasłużony Nauczyciel PRL.
- Medal of the Commission of National Education.
- Individual Award, 1st Degree, Ministry of Health and Social Welfare.
- Team Award, 1st Degree, Ministry of Health and Social Welfare.
- "In plantis magna latet virtus" – a distinction of the Polish Herbal Committee for contribution to the development of native phytotherapy.

== Commemoration ==
On the initiative of the "Czas Przestrzeń Tożsamość" association, in 2011 a memorial tree dedicated to Leonidas Samochowiec was planted at the Central Cemetery in Szczecin.

== Bibliography ==
- Współcześni uczeni polscy. Słownik biograficzny. Vol. 4. Janusz Kapuścik (ed.). Warszawa. 2002. p. 38.
