= Pomeranian Medical University =

Medical school in Szczecin, Poland

Coordinates: 53°25′23″N 14°33′15″E

Pomeranian Medical University in Szczecin
- Pomorski Uniwersytet Medyczny w Szczecinie
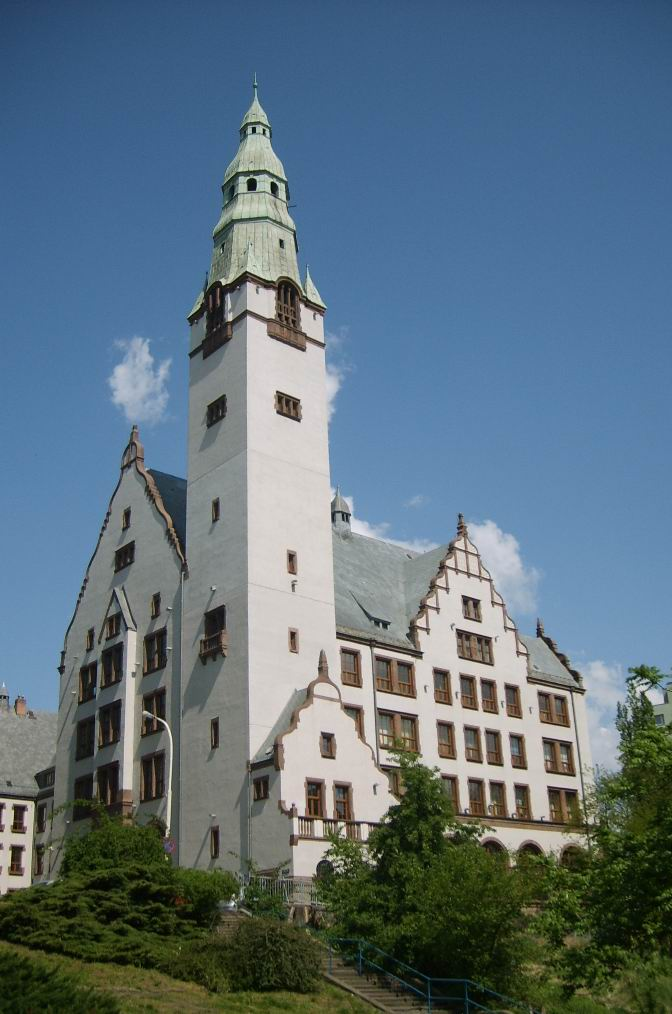
- Latin: Universitas Medica Pomeraniensis
- Motto: "Salus aegroti suprema lex"
- Type: Medical university
- Established: 1948
- Affiliations: Socrates-Erasmus
- Rector: prof. dr hab. n. med. Leszek Domański
- Students: 5,425 (12.2023)
- Location: ul. Rybacka 1; 70-204, Szczecin, Poland
- Website: www.pum.edu.pl

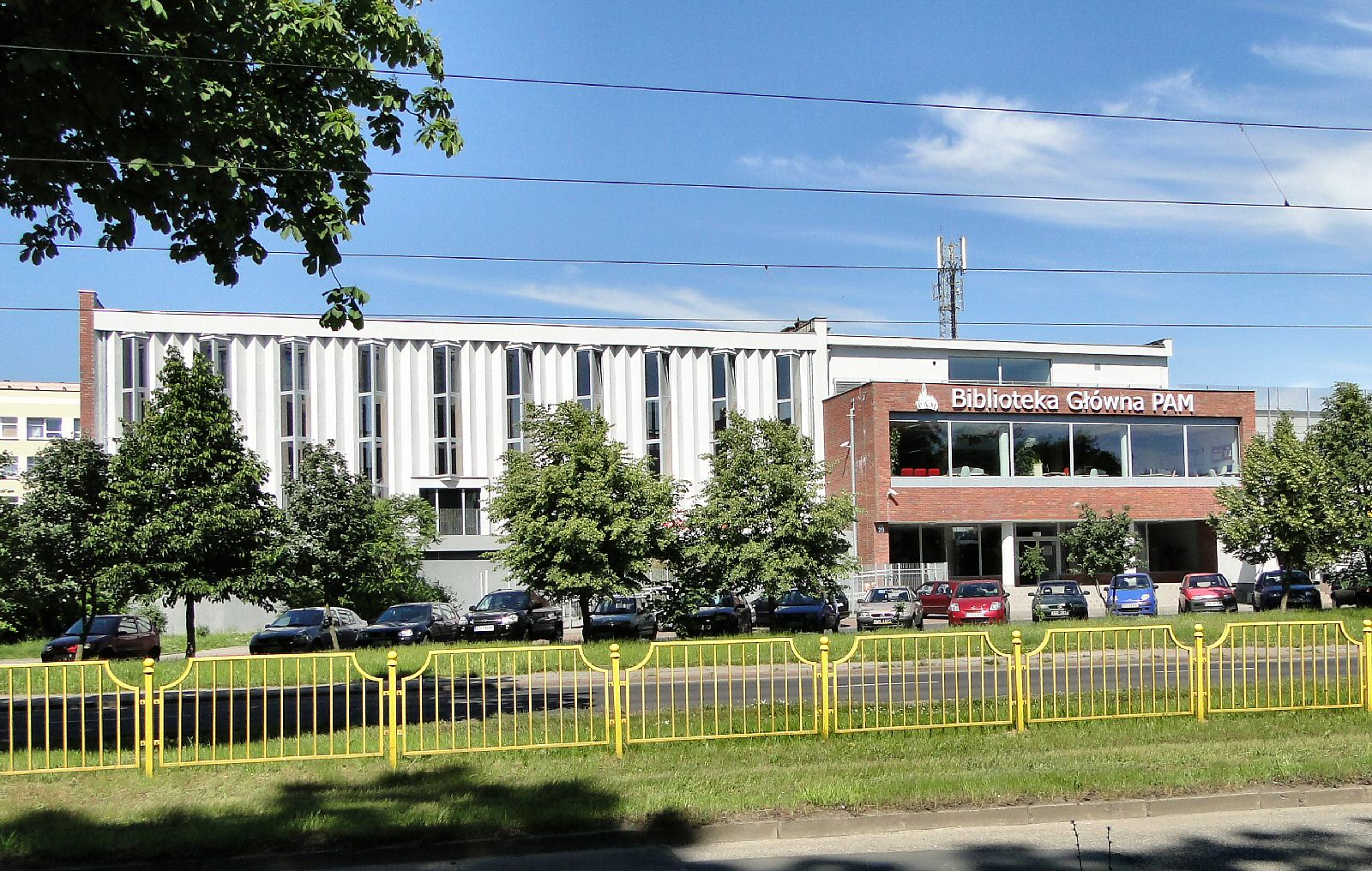
Main Library

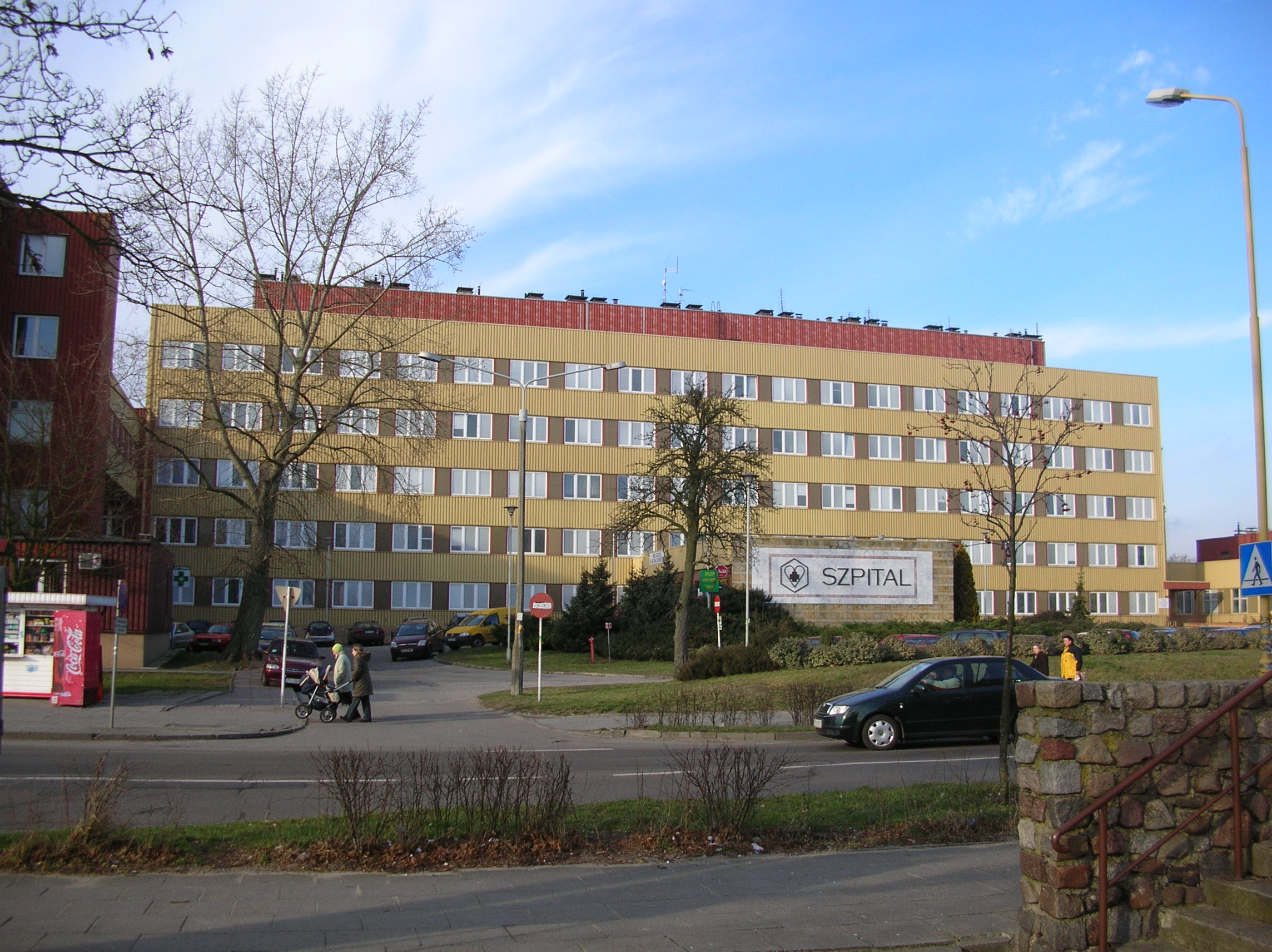
Pomeranian Medical University, the hospital in Police, Pomerania, Poland

Pomeranian Medical University (PMU) was established in 1948 in Szczecin, Poland. It is referred to as Pomorski Uniwersytet Medyczny in Polish.

It was founded as the Akademia Lekarska w Szczecinie ('Academy for Doctors in Szczecin'), then renamed to Pomorska Akademia Medyczna w Szczecinie (PAM; 'Pomeranian Academy of Medicine in Szczecin') in 1992, and finally to Pomorski Uniwersytet Medyczny w Szczecinie (PUM; 'Pomeranian University of Medicine in Szczecin') on 21 August 2010.

== History ==
PMU has existed for 78 years, much less than the multicentennial tradition of other universities. However, it is one of the first schools of higher learning in Szczecin, and the establishment of the university took place just after an exceptionally devastating war, with local physicians, scientists, and teachers missing altogether.

The first organizers of the Pomeranian Medical University were Jakub Węgierko (first rector) and professors Tadeusz Chorążak, Artur Chwalibogowski, Tadeusz Markiewicz, Czesław Murczyński, Tadeusz Mieczysław Sokołowski, Witold Starkiewicz, Kazimierz Stojałowski, Józef Taniewski, and January Zubrzycki. Soon to join them were professors Izabela Cwojdzinska-Gadzikiewicz, Lech Dzialoszynski, Adam Krechowiecki, Wanda Murczynska, Jan Słotwiński, Eugeniusz Miętkiewski, Edward Gorzkowski, Irena Konopacka-Semadeni, and Bolesław Górnicki.

Owing to the significant number of professors settling in Szczecin, the Pomeranian Medical University became the sole school of higher learning in this town bestowed with full academic powers to hold doctoral and habilitated doctor studies and grant doctoral degrees.

The passion and efforts of the pioneers resulted in an increasing number of students and academic teachers, a widening scope and rising level of specialized health services, and in scientific research of growing importance.

In spite of financial and technical difficulties, new lecture halls, student hostels, and other buildings of social use were erected. These include two new lecture halls in the First and Second State Clinical Hospitals, three new hostels, the Main Library, one sports hall, three vacations centres, etc. Modern buildings for the Department of Clinical Biochemistry and for the Department of Psychiatry were erected.

At present the university has more than 1,370 beds in both State Clinical Hospitals and almost 400 beds in other hospitals in Szczecin. Altogether, there are approximately 1,780 beds in the clinical departments and the number of patients treated yearly exceeds 32,000.

Clinical departments of the University, besides offering sophisticated health care services for the Western Pomerania region, provide basic medical care because Szczecin does not possess a municipal hospital. Furthermore, the outpatient departments are an important element of the treatment and services base of the region, acting chiefly as specialized consultancy centres with a yearly number of visits exceeding 160,000.

Between 1994 and 2000, nine young academic teachers in PMU received prestigious scholarships of the Polish Science Foundation. Presently the University has 1478 students, including 1012 students of medicine and 466 of dentistry.

Students' Scientific Association at PMU organises annual the nationwide and international Medical Students' Conference.

== Administration ==
The Pomeranian Medical University has more than 500 faculty and almost 200 technical staff, including scientists, teachers, and physicians. Among the academic staff are 43 professors and 54 habilitated doctors. Since 1948, 8060 physicians and 3314 dentists graduated from the university. 1113 researchers obtained the degree of doctor and 196 of habilitated doctor. The university employs 33 professors and 36 extraordinary professors.

The title of doctor honoris causa was granted to 15 renowned scientists: Witold Starkiewicz (1973), Kazimierz Stojałowski (1974), Eugeniusz Miętkiewski (1985), Jerzy Kulczycki (1987), Andre Raymond Ardaillou (1991), Marek Eisner (1992), Zbigniew Jańczuk (1994), Franciszek Kokot (1995), Leonidas Samochowiec (1995), Hans Schadewaldt (1995), Eberhard Ritz (1996), Dietrich Kettler (1996), Mary Osborne (1997), Stanislaw Woyke (1998), and Alan Gewirtz (1999).

New, unconventional forms of teaching were adopted during the academic year 1996/97. These are extramural studies in nursing leading to the title of master, studies for English-speaking students from Scandinavia, Europe, Israel, Canada and more, and evening full-pay studies in medicine. The Faculty of Pharmacy would be established in the near future.

The university has also maintained academic and research contacts with institutions outside Poland, including the University of Pennsylvania in Philadelphia and institutions in the European Union. These contacts have resulted in the exchange of junior scientists, as well as in numerous publications in Western journals.

PMU hopes to overcome some shortcomings as to its facilities and instrumentation, with the help of the commitment and enthusiasm of its staff. It also hopes to have even better co-operation with the health service system in the region and the Ministry and the Scientific Research Committee.

The present authorities of the University have set many goals for the incoming years. The most important one is to improve the curriculum by modernizing and making more attractive the forms of teaching, so that students graduating from the university will be well prepared to meet the needs of their profession and also call the period of studies as one of the best in their lives.

Students wanting more of their studies may deepen their knowledge and become acquainted with the methodology of scientific research by joining one of some 20 Student Scientific Groups, now with almost 100 members. On December 6–7, 2000, the All-Polish Conference of the Student Scientific Groups was held. Furthermore, members of the Student Scientific Society participate in national and foreign conferences. Following their graduation and an internship of 12 months some of these students join the staff of their Alma Mater each year.

== Facilities ==
Important centres for information and documentation, indispensable for research activities, are the Main Library and the Publishing Division of PMU.

The Main Library continues to grow since 1949, albeit with varying pace over the years. It has two sections in the Clinical Hospitals, stores more than 260,000 books and offers 584 periodicals. Scientific, experimental, clinical, historical and bibliographic papers appear in the Annals of the university since 1950. Initially, the Annals were published irregularly in the form of separate collections of papers, but since 1962 they constitute a regular, reviewed scientific publication under the title of Annales Academiae Medicae Stetinensis indexed i.a. in Index Medicus. In principle, the Annals contain condensed versions of doctoral theses, while supplements usually contain habilitated doctor theses.

The Publishing Division is the editor of other publications such as handbooks for students, post-graduate education aids, medical and administrative guide-books, growing steadily since 1969.

== Faculties ==
The university consists of four faculties:

- Faculty of Medicine:
  - Medicine specialization
  - Medicine specialization - English programme
- Faculty of Dentistry:
  - Dentistry specialization
  - Dentistry specialization - English programme
  - Dental hygienist specialization
- Faculty of Biotechnology:
  - Medical technologist specialization (Clinical Laboratory Science)
  - Biotechnology specialization (Medical Biotechnology)
- Faculty of Health Sciences:
  - Paramedic specialization
  - Midwifery specialization
  - Physiotherapy specialization
  - Clinical Nurse specialization
  - Public Health specialization
  - Cosmetology specialization

The university has also English programme for foreign students. They intend to establish a faculty of pharmacy in the future.
