= Mary Osborn Douthit =

American settler, teacher, and suffragist

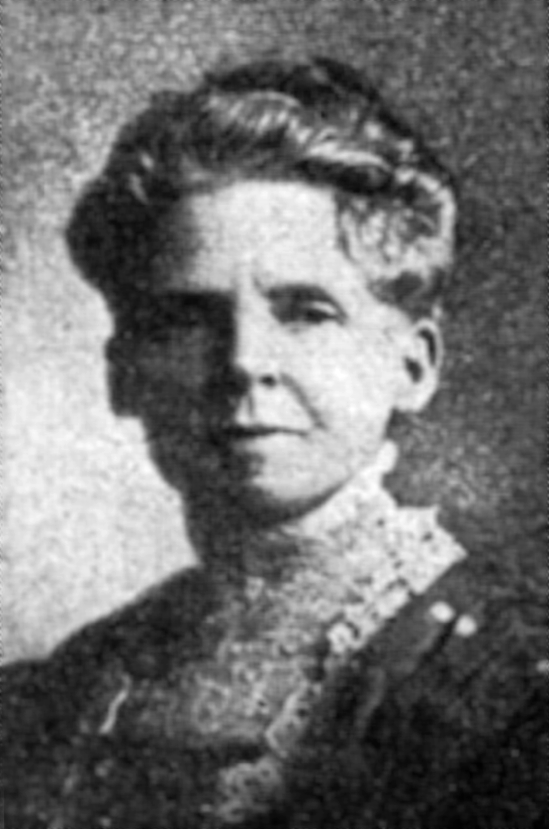
Mary Osborn Douthit

Mary Osborn Douthit (1850–1908) was an early white settler of the Oregon Country, a teacher, a prominent advocate of woman suffrage, and editor of the book The Souvenir of Western Women, published to coincide with the Lewis and Clark Centennial Exposition in Portland, Oregon in 1905. She immigrated to Oregon in 1853 at the age of three. Her parents were James Harrison and Lueza Osborn Douthit. She was killed when struck by a streetcar in downtown Portland in 1908; she had been living in Portland for 15 years. According to fellow suffragist Abigail Scott Duniway, Douthit's untimely death cut short a literary career on the cusp of success. Her book had brief, positive mentions in the Oregon Historical Quarterly and in the Pacific Monthly.
