= Janusz Rybakowski =

Polish psychiatrist (born 1946)

- Born: 8 January 1946
- Scientific career
- Fields: psychiatry

Janusz Kazimierz Rybakowski (born 8 January 1946) is a psychiatrist, professor at the Poznań University of Medical Sciences.

== Biography ==
The grandson of Władysław Rybakowski, he obtained his medical degree at the Poznań Medical Academy (currently the Poznań University of Medical Sciences) in 1969 and at this university he obtained subsequent academic degrees and academic promotions (doctorate in 1973, habilitation in 1980).

In 1976–1977 he was a fellow of the US National Institutes of Health at the Department of Psychiatry at the University of Pennsylvania in Philadelphia. In the years 1985–1995 he was the head of the Department and Clinic of Psychiatry at the Medical University of Bydgoszcz. In the years 1998–2001 he was the president of the Polish Psychiatric Association. He became the chairman of the Program Council of the journal “Psychiatria Polska” and the editor-in-chief of journals “Farmakoterapia w Psychiatrii i Neurologii” and “Neuropsychiatria i Neuropsychologia”, as well as a member of the Committee of Neurobiology and the Committee on Neurological Sciences of the Polish Academy of Sciences.

In 2022 he became a member of the Polish Academy of Sciences, as the first psychiatrist in the history of the Polish Academy of Sciences to become its member. He supervised 40 doctoral theses.

He was a member of the Polish United Workers' Party until the end of its existence. His son Filip Rybakowski is a psychiatrist.

== Books ==
- Oblicza choroby maniakalno-depresyjnej. Termedia. 2018. 3rd edition. Published also in English and Russian languages.
- Lit – niezwykły lek w psychiatrii. Termedia. 2019. Published also in English and Russian languages.
- Psychofarmakologia kliniczna. 2022. Co-author and editor.

== Awards ==
- Lifetime Achievement Award from the European Bipolar Forum for overall research on bipolar disorder (2012)
- Lifetime Achievement Award from the World Society of Biological Psychiatry (2015)
- Mogens Schou Research Award from the International Society of Bipolar Disorder (2018)
