= 1941 Białystok massacres =

Mass murders of Jews in Białystok during WW II

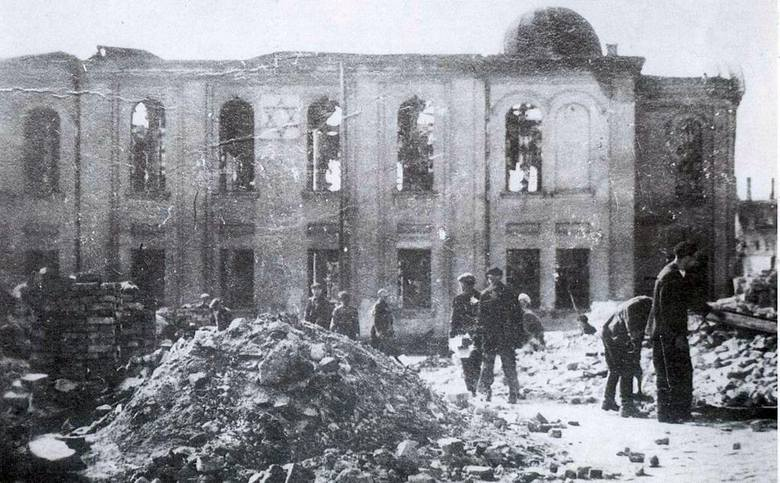
- Ruins of the Great Synagogue in Białystok, where on June 27, 1941, German policemen burned approximately 700–800 Jews.
- Location: Białystok, occupied Poland
- Date: June 27, July 3–4 and July 12–13, 1941
- Incident type: Genocide, Mass shootings
- Perpetrators: Ernst Weiss, Heinrich Schneider, Otto Bradfisch, Max Montua, Gustav Waldow, Gottlieb Nagel
- Organizations: Ordnungspolizei, Einsatzgruppen
- Victims: from 6,500 to 7,000 Polish Jews

1941 Białystok massacres refers to the series of pogroms and mass executions committed by the Ordnungspolizei and SS against the Jewish population of Białystok in occupied Poland. These atrocities were committed at the turn of June and July 1941, following the German invasion of the USSR.

On June 27, 1941, Białystok fell to German troops. Accompanied by Wehrmacht soldiers, members of the Police Battalion 309 entered the city. Initially tasked with searching the Jewish districts to apprehend Red Army remnants and "hostile elements," this operation took a brutal turn due to the radically anti-Semitic attitude of certain officers and non-commissioned officers. What began as a city search evolved into a massacre. On that day, approximately 2,000 to 3,000 of Białystok's Jews were murdered by the German policemen, with around 700–800 burned alive in the Great Synagogue.

Following this, on July 3, Einsatzgruppe B rounded up nearly a thousand Jews in Białystok. About 300 prisoners, primarily intellectuals, were executed the following day in the Pietrasze forest. Further executions, directly ordered by Heinrich Himmler, occurred on July 12 and 13. During these days, members of the police battalions 316 and 322 shot approximately 4,000 Jews in the Pietrasze forest.

Estimates suggest that at the turn of June and July 1941, the Nazis murdered between 6,500 and 7,000 Jews in Białystok. On August 1, 1941, the remaining Jews were confined to the newly established Białystok Ghetto.

== Jews of Białystok in the years of 1939–1941 ==
In the 1936 census, Białystok was home to 44,482 Jews, accounting for nearly 45% of the city's population.

In the second half of September 1939, after the invasion of Poland, the city fell under temporary German occupation. When Wehrmacht troops entered the city on September 15, 11 men, including 6 Jews, were shot by soldiers from the "Lötzen" Infantry Brigade. Two additional Jews fell victim to the Nazis in subsequent days, while many others were imprisoned in a transit camp established within the premises of Primary School No. 1 on Ogrodowa Street. On September 20, members of Einsatzgruppe IV inspected the camp and, citing 'disobedience,' executed 8 prisoners, including two Jews.

After a week, the Germans retreated, relinquishing control of the city to the Soviets. Over the two-year Soviet occupation, the Jewish population in Białystok swelled to approximately 50,000, mainly due to the influx of refugees from the German-occupied zones.

== The outbreak of German-Soviet war ==
On June 22, 1941, Nazi Germany initiated an invasion of the Soviet Union. Białystok lay in the primary path of Army Group Centre's offensive. Its armies were followed by Einsatzgruppe B, a special operational group of the SD and Sicherheitspolizei, which was ultimately to operate in the areas Belarus and central Russia.

Furthermore, four Order Police battalions were sent to the Army Group Centre Rear Area. Three of them: 307, 316 and 322 formed the Police Regiment Centre (Polizei-Regiment Mitte), whose commander was Col. Max Montua. On the other hand, the 309 battalion, formed in September 1940 in Cologne, was assigned to the 221st Security Division (221. Sicherungs-Division). The general authority over SS and Ordnungspolizei forces in occupied Belarus, including Białystok area and north-eastern part of Polish Kresy, was exercised by the Higher SS and Police Leader "Russia-Centre", SS-Gruppenführer Erich von dem Bach-Zelewski (Höherer SS- und Polizeiführer "Rußland-Mitte").

It is difficult to ascertain the exact orders received by members of the Einsatzgruppen prior to the invasion of the USSR. Some evidence suggests they were instructed primarily to execute Communist Party functionaries, "Jews in Party and state positions," and "other radical elements" Nevertheless, many SS and Ordnungspolizei officers, tasked to operate in the East, inclined toward a more extreme approach from the onset. For example, in the initial days of the German-Soviet war, the Einsatzgruppen executed Jewish men en masse, often without differentiating whether they were Communist Party members or state employees. Such actions of local commanders were sanctioning ex post facto by Heinrich Himmler and SS leading officers.

Also, Maj. Ernst Weiss, commander of the Police Battalion 309, providing his officers with the Commissar Order and the Barbarossa decree, supplemented them with his own interpretation, asserting that, in his view, the Führer's orders necessitated the liquidation of all Jews, irrespective of age or gender. (Note: A member of Police Battalion 309 testified post-war that before Operation Barbarossa, the battalion has also watched the anti-Semitic film Jud Süß. See: Westermann (2005), p. 175.) Shortly after, the unit under his command perpetrated a large-scale massacre of Jews in Białystok.

== The "Black Friday" of June 27, 1941 ==
=== Background ===
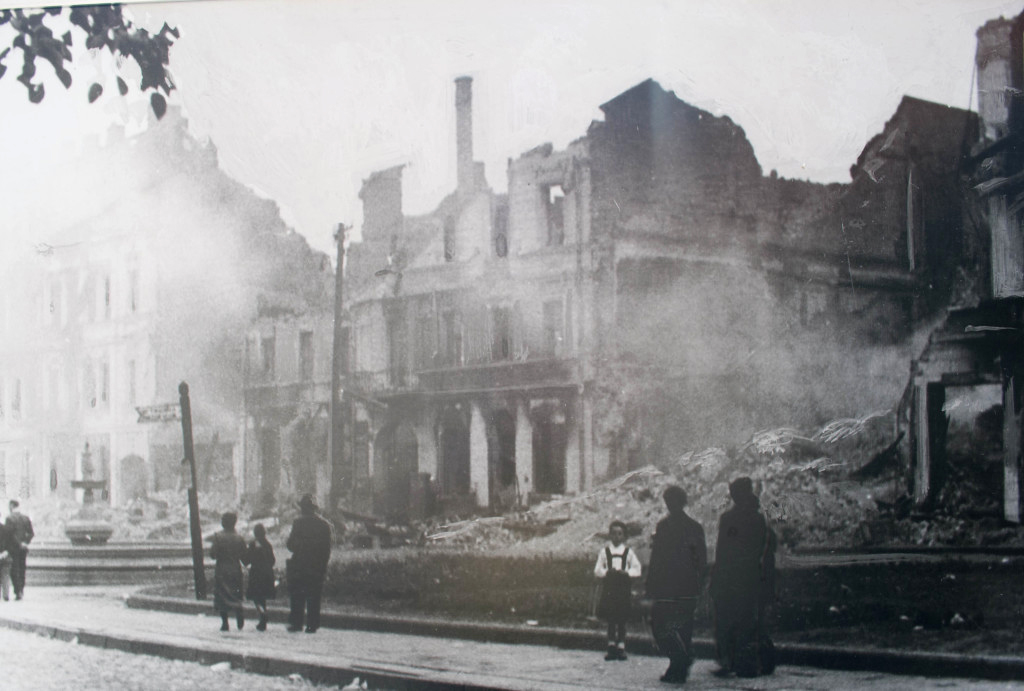
Białystok, June 1941. Ruins of burned houses

After the outbreak of the German-Soviet war, chaos quickly engulfed Białystok. Soviet occupation apparatus members and their families fled in panic. Fear of Luftwaffe air raids and Soviet repression triggered an exodus of many residents from the city. Instances of shop and warehouse looting occurred. Approximately 2,150 political and criminal prisoners escaped from the local prison, as NKVD guards fled. Up to 200 inhabitants of Białystok and the surrounding area were killed by the retreating Soviets. Additionally, some accounts reported incidents of Poles attacking Jews in Białystok.

On June 27, around 6:00 a.m., units of the German 221st Security Division entered Białystok. Wehrmacht soldiers were accompanied by members of Police Battalion 309. The battalion's 1st and 3rd companies approached from the west and southwest in the morning, while the 2nd Company joined from the southeast later in the day. All three units positioned themselves in the Kościuszko Square area.

The Germans encountered minimal resistance from remaining Red Army troops and "partisans." Official reports claimed that during several hours of skirmishes, three German officers and 43 non-commissioned officers and soldiers were killed. (Note: According to other source, the 221st Security Division reported losses of 4 officers and 81 soldiers. See: Żbikowski (2006), p. 197.) The 221st Division's war diary on June 27 recorded that during the combing of the city and the accompanying skirmishes, "many houses caught fire, including the synagogue." The fires were quelled only by sappers demolishing buildings to contain the spread.

The Police Battalion 309's war diary entries from June 27 and 28 mentioned the Great Synagogue catching fire due to "anti-tank gun shelling," leading to the blaze extending to the market square and the city's southern sector. According to the same source, "approximately 200 Russian soldiers, partisans and Jews" were killed "partly as a result of the exchange of fire." While one company attempted to douse the flames, the other two patrolled the city, "taking care of order and security", "teaching a lesson" to looters, recovering looted property and – "with the help of Jews" – clearing up the corpses that littered the streets. A subsequent report prepared by the Abwehr for the German press exaggeratedly detailed "raging street fighting," claiming the 221st Division commander personally led an assault on the municipal government headquarters and highlighted snipers purportedly hiding in the Great Synagogue and "targeting our scouts from behind".

However, these portrayals in German reports completely misrepresented reality, as the entering soldiers and policemen probably faced minimal resistance. The embellished descriptions of street fights aimed to mask the significant atrocities committed by the Germans that day, especially the fact that also some Wehrmacht soldiers participated in these actions.

The actual sequence of events has been reconstructed based on investigative and judicial materials collected after the war in West Germany. Former policemen interrogated in the 1960s and 1970s testified that their initial orders were to round up Soviet remnants and 'anti-German elements,' particularly Jewish men capable of carrying weapons. The battalion commander's orders did not specify what should be done with the detainees. In this context, a group of fanatical officers and non-commissioned officers took initiative, recalling Weiss's prior calls for the elimination of Jews and recognizing the Nazi leadership's view of the war with the Soviet Union as a 'clash of opposing ideologies.' Subsequently, the city's combing swiftly devolved into an orgy of violence and looting.

Some former policemen attributed this escalation to Lt. Heinrich "Pipo" Schneider (Note: He was a platoon commander in the 3rd company, known for his fanatical Nazi beliefs. A few times he expressed his conviction that "the Führer would no longer feed these dirty Jordan slouchers." See: Browning (2004), p. 255–256.) and other officers from the 3rd company. Christian Gerlach placed the primary responsibility for initiating the pogrom on the 1st company and its commander, Cpt. Hans Behrens. Conversely, Edward B. Westermann indicates that both companies were equally involved in the murder and terrorization of Jews. The policemen's brutal conduct might have been influenced by their earlier looting of numerous alcohol stores upon entering Białystok. (Note: Also, Peter Longerich and Philip Blood suggest that alcohol significantly influenced the behavior of the policemen. See: Longerich (2012), p. 203 and Blood (2021), p. 108.) Meanwhile, the battalion commander seemed unable or unwilling to curb his subordinates. (Note: General Johann Pflugbeil, commander of the 221st Security Division, claimed post-war that during the pogrom, he sent a liaison officer to the commander of Police Battalion 309 for explanations. However, the allegedly intoxicated Weiss denied knowledge of the excesses committed by his subordinates. See: Bender (2008), p. 91.)

However, certain authors tend to assign a more significant role to him in the events of June 27. Daniel Goldhagen, in particular, believes that the massacre was planned and ordered by Weiss from the outset. Gerlach, though, contends that some policemen's testimonies about a clear order to murder Jews, purportedly received personally from Adolf Hitler by the battalion, were part of their trial strategy.

=== The massacre ===
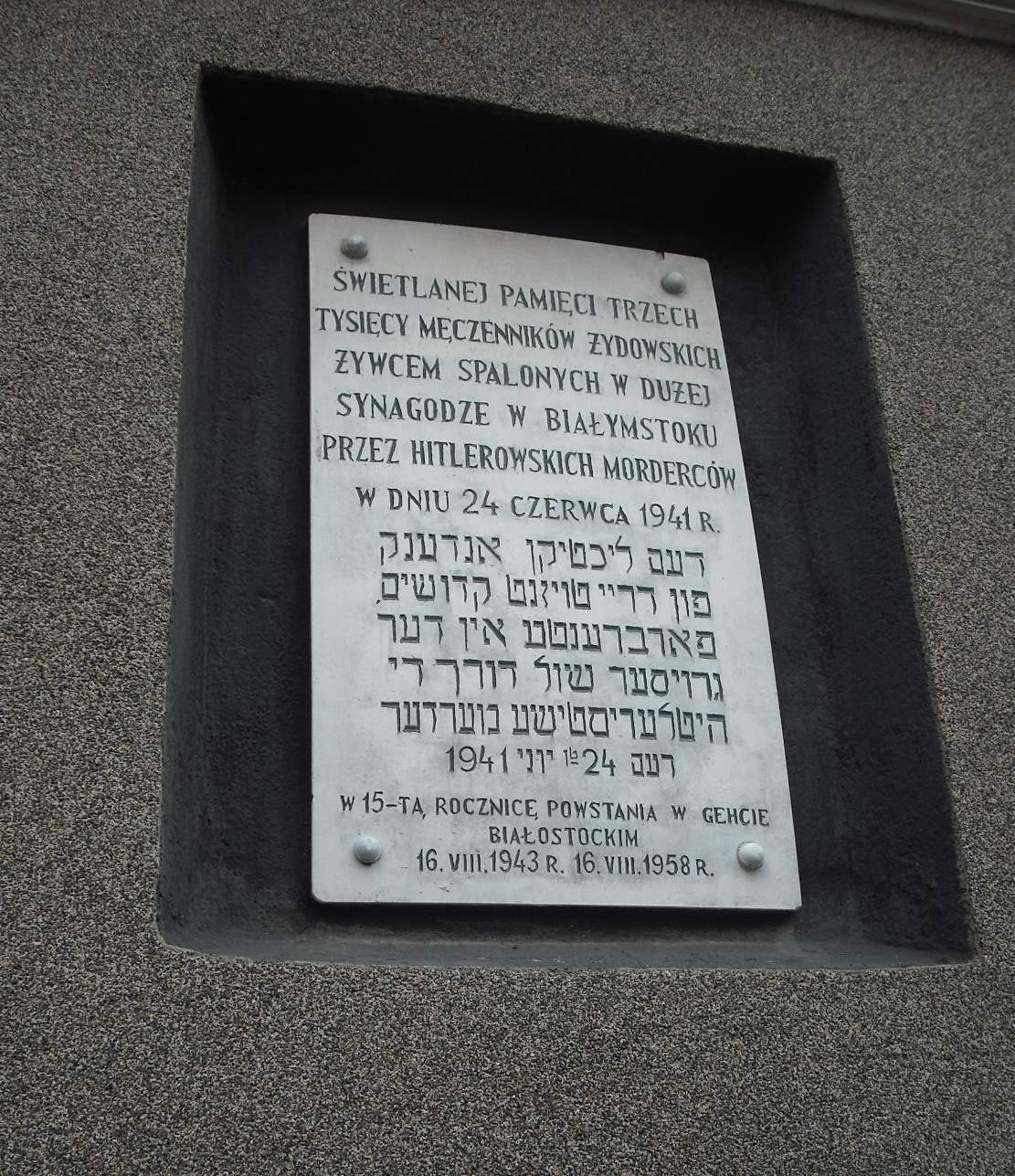
A plaque on the wall of the building at Suraska 1 Street, commemorating the victims of the "Black Friday"

A few hours after entering Białystok, members of Police Battalion 309 surrounded the Jewish-inhabited district in the city center known as Szulhojf. Soon, the pogrom extended to the Piaski district and the Fish Market (Rynek Rybny) area. Jewish men and boys were forcibly taken from streets and homes, either to Kościuszko Square or to the Great Synagogue on Wilcza Street. Former policemen's postwar testimonies mentioned assistance from some local Poles in identifying Jews. Subsequently, one of the battalion's subunits received orders to kill all the Jews who refused to open their doors.

Captured Jews were subjected to severe beating and humiliation. The policemen forced them to dance and sing religious songs. There were also cases of setting fire to the beards of Orthodox Jews. Some others were forced to shout, "I am Jesus Christ." A group of Jews went to the headquarters of the 221st Security Division to beg its commander for intervention. However, when they fell to their knees, General Johann Pflugbeil turned his back and a policeman present at the headquarters urinated on them. Elsewhere, a certain police officer expressed disapproval of his colleagues' conduct, only to be told in response: "You don't seem to have received the right ideological training yet."

Hundreds of Jews were killed in Białystok that day. Some were executed in their homes or on the streets, while others were taken to execution sites on the city outskirts. Mass executions occurred, notably in the park surrounding the Branicki Palace. The policemen also murdered the patients in the Jewish hospital. These mass executions persisted into the night, carried out under parking lights. Additionally, there are reports implicating Wehrmacht soldiers in the violence; while some sources mention individual soldiers, others implicate the entire subunit of the 350th Infantry Regiment.

The most significant massacre occurred at the Great Synagogue, where German policemen herded hundreds of captured Jews alongside several others seeking refuge there. Estimates vary widely; some suggest the count could have reached as high as 2,500, while others estimate it much lower, around 500. The count of around 700 to 800 is likely closer to the actual figure. Among them were women with children. The policemen sealed the synagogue doors and formed a double cordon around the building. They brought in trucks carrying barrels of gasoline, pouring the contents over the walls. In the evening, Lt. Schneider ordered the synagogue to be set ablaze, using hand grenades to ignite the fire. Policemen shot those attempting to escape through windows, including children lifted by their parents in desperate attempts for mercy. A Pole named Józef Bartoszko (a Shabbos goy), risking his life, opened the synagogue's back door, allowing a dozen to thirty Jews to escape.

The grenades' explosions spread the fire to neighboring buildings. Jews fleeing the flames were killed by the policemen. Major Weiss only ordered firefighting efforts when the fire endangered the battalion's vehicles. Houses were blown up to contain the blaze, resulting in the deaths of those inside.

Estimates vary regarding the number of Jews murdered in Białystok on June 27. The Encyclopedia of Camps and Ghettos, 1933–1945 estimate the number of victims from 2,000 to 3,000 individuals. Christopher Browning estimated between 2,000 and 2,200 victims, while Philip Blood suggested around 3,000. Other historians estimate that the number of victims was at least 2,000. The day was memorialized as "Black Friday" in Białystok's history, with Holocaust survivors also recalling it as "Red Friday" or "Bloody Friday". The victims of this massacre were referred to by surviving Jews as the "Friday victims".

Despite the chaotic and arbitrary nature of these atrocities, German authorities didn't hold the policemen accountable or take any disciplinary actions. Major Weiss and General Pflugbeil commended the members of Police Battalion 309 for their actions, with Weiss even being nominated for the Iron Cross, 2nd class.

== First days of the German occupation ==
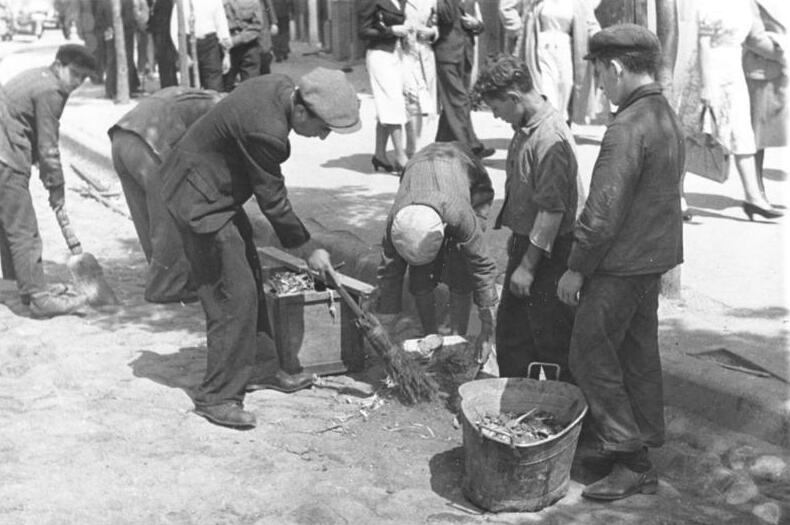
June 1941. A group of Jews forced to clean the streets of Białystok

On June 28, General Pflugbeil summoned the commanders of all German units stationed in Białystok to a briefing. Most likely, influenced by the events of the previous day, he issued a written order to "shoot civilians only if they resist, either on the spot or in remote locations, and without any witnesses." His second order was to avoid fires. Additionally, it justified that "a fire broke out in the synagogue as a result of gunfire because shots were fired from this building."

Meanwhile, an Ortskommandantur was established in Białystok, while the Feldkommandantur 683, commanded by Colonel Percy Baron von Ascheberg, was entrusted with maintaining order in the city itself. However, on July 1, the other unit, Feldkommandantur 549, was located in Białystok, and this time, maintaining order in the city was entrusted to the Ortskommandantur 644.

On June 29, the chief rabbi of Białystok, Gedalia Rosenmann, was summoned to the Feldkommandantur and ordered to appoint a 12-person Judenrat within 24 hours. For the next month, Rosenmann formally held the position of chairman of the Judenrat, but Ephraim Barash, a social activist and pre-war chairman of the Białystok Jewish community, managed its work from the beginning. One of the Germans' initial orders to the Judenrat was to provide a significant amount of blankets, pillows, fur coats, skins, and a contingent of forced laborers.

On June 30, at the command of the 221st Security Division, a work brigade comprising Jews was formed to dismantle all monuments to Stalin and Lenin in the city. These scenes were filmed by the Propaganda-Abteilung team. On July 3, several German units, including Police Battalion 309, marched east from Białystok.

== Massacres in July 1941 ==
=== The Thursday's action ===
On July 1, 1941, members of Einsatzkommando 8 (EK 8) entered the city. EK 8, a subunit of Einsatzgruppe B, was under the command of SS-Sturmbannführer Otto Bradfisch. It remained in Białystok and its vicinity until July 4, dispatching separate subunits (Teilkommandos) to Vawkavysk and Novogrudok. On July 3, the EG B staff, led by SS-Gruppenführer Arthur Nebe, briefly appeared in Białystok. Additionally, to provide temporary support to EK 8, a special unit was dispatched to Białystok, composed of officers from the office of the Commandant of SD and the Sicherheitspolizei (KdS) for the Warsaw District of General Government. This unit was led by SS-Hauptsturmführer Wolfgang Birkner.

Members of EK 8 conducted mass arrests in Białystok on July 3. Among the detainees were several dozen Jewish lawyers, who were summoned to Ortskommandantur at Warszawska Street under false pretenses. Nearly a thousand Jews were arrested in total and held in the Ortskommandantur's building. At night, SS officers, many of whom were intoxicated, interrogated these prisoners. The Germans focused on their professions and examined their hands. About 300 representatives of the intelligentsia were 'selected' during these interrogations, while the remaining Jews were released to their homes.

The following day, on July 4, 300 prisoners (Note: This number of victims is given by Szymon Datner and Sara Bender (see: Datner (1946), p. 14 and Bender (2008), p. 93). However, the authors of the Catalog of monuments, commemorative plaques and places of national memory in Białystok mention that on that day 200 Jews and non-Jewish communist activists were executed in the Pietrasze forest, while Ewa Rogalewska estimate that the number of victims was about 200 (solely Jews). In turn, in the operational report of July 13, 1941, Einsatzkommando 8 took credit for shooting "215 communists and Jews" in Białystok. See: Kieliński et al. (2017), p. 183, Rogalewska (2008), p. 71 and Żbikowski (2006), p. 192.) were taken to the Pietrasze forest, about three kilometers northeast of the city. Throughout the march, German guards beat Jews and forced them to sing. Upon arrival, all the prisoners were executed. The victims of this massacre were identified by surviving Jews as the "Thursday victims".

=== The Saturday's action ===
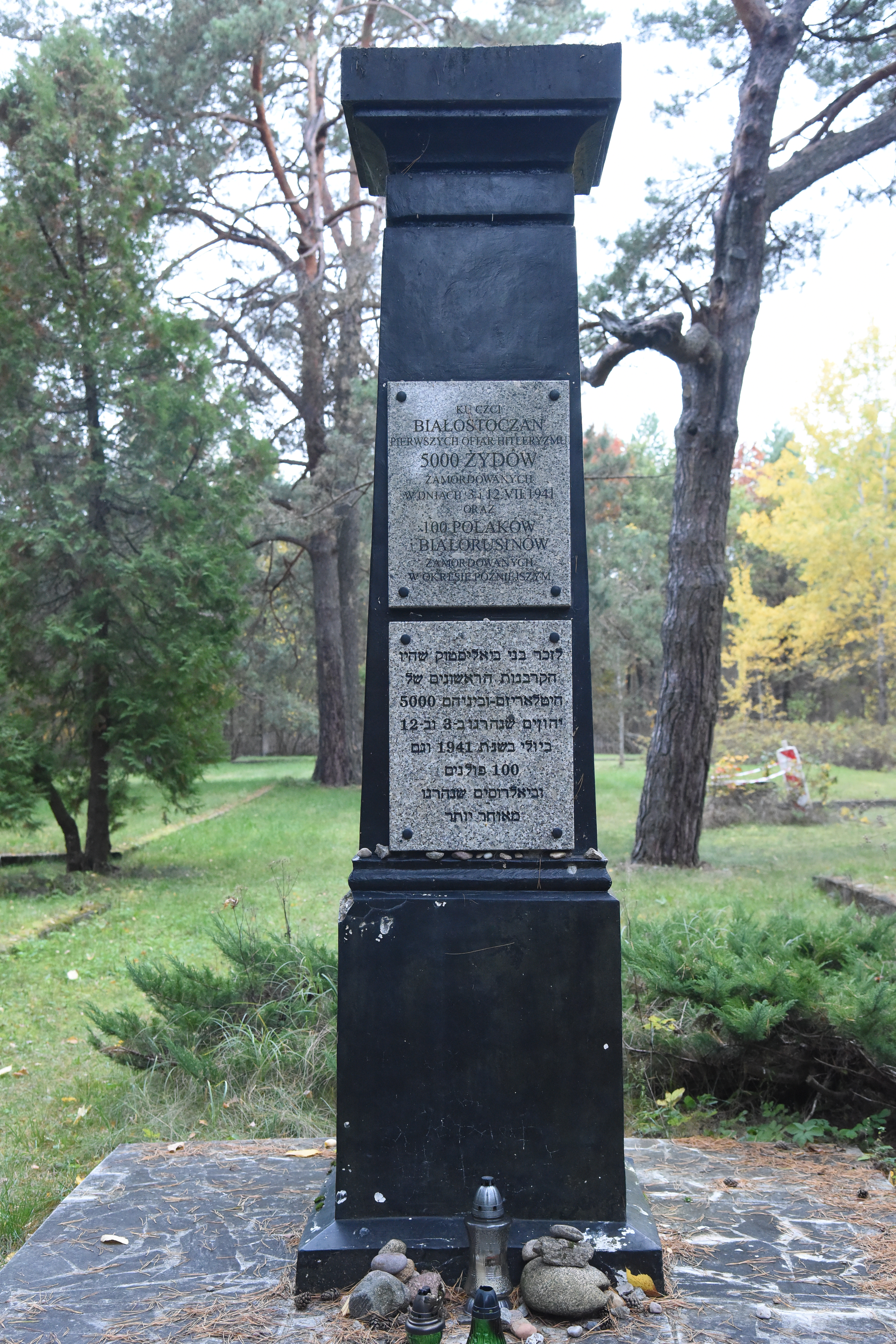
A monument at the place of execution in the Pietrasze forest

On the night of July 5–6, Police Battalions 316 and 322 entered Białystok. On July 8, under the pretext of searching for property looted during the final days of Soviet rule, members of Police Battalion 322 conducted an extensive search in the city, primarily targeting houses in the Jewish district. This operation resulted in the shooting of 22 Jews and Poles. (Note: German reports suggest that two or three Poles were shot immediately, and a group of detained individuals, including twelve Jews and four Poles, was handed over by the Ordnungspolizei to EK 8 officers for execution outside the city on the same night. See: Żbikowski (2006), p. 199–200.) The Germans confiscated 20 truckloads of 'valuable items,' supposedly all acquired through looting. On the same day, the Judenrat, at the Nazis' request, issued an order mandating that all Jews aged 14 and older wear armbands displaying a blue Star of David or a yellow badge on their right arm.

On that day, Reichsführer-SS Heinrich Himmler, accompanied by SS-Obergruppenführer Kurt Daluege, inspected Białystok. Some historians suggest that the decision for further mass executions was made during this visit. (Note: Some sources even say that during the Himmler's inspection a specific number of Jews – around 2,000 – was designated to be executed (see: Bender (2008), p. 94 and Dean, Hecker (2012), p. 858). Some authors also say that the mass executions had already begun in the afternoon of July 8 (see: Dmitrów (2002), p. 314 and Matthäus (2007), p. 224).) One witness, recounting a second-hand account, claimed that during a speech, Himmler expressed dissatisfaction with the insufficient number of Jews arrested so far. However, Jürgen Matthäus did not rule out that Himmler merely approved the prior actions of the SS and police, which his subordinates interpreted as a signal to proceed with further killings.

On July 9, Daluege addressed policemen gathered at the city stadium, emphasizing their role in the mission to destroy Bolshevism. He declared their campaign as crucial, stating, "No other campaign is as important as yours. Now Bolshevism will finally be eradicated, for the greater good of Germany, Europe, and the entire world."

By July 11, the commander of Police Regiment Centre, Col. Max Montua, acting on behalf of SS-Gruppenführer Erich von dem Bach-Zelewski, issued detailed guidelines for the extermination action. Commanders of both police battalions, Maj. Gustav Waldow and Maj. Gottlieb Nagel, received these orders. Montua's directive specified that "all Jews aged 17–45 who have participating in the looting of shops are to be immediately shot". Executions were to occur in "a location far from cities, villages, and large traffic arteries". while the bodies of the victims "shall not be buried in locations accessible to passerby". Also, photography during the execution was prohibited. Finally, Montua suggested officers provide evening entertainment for the executioners and convince them of the "political exigency of such an action."

According to Polish sources, the Nazis spread rumors among Białystok's residents, alleging the mass executions were due to the disappearance of five or six German policemen who had gone AWOL and due to alcohol intoxication failed to return for roll call.

The aktion commenced on July 12 at 5:00 a.m. Over 1,000 policemen surrounded Jewish neighborhoods, forcibly extracting men and boys from their homes. Post-war testimonies of officers revealed that identifying Jews was not arduous, given their marked armbands. Additionally, assisting Poles aided the policemen in locating Jews. Captured Jews were herded to the Municipal Stadium under the watch of the members of the Police Battalion 322. Despite scorching temperatures, the prisoners were denied water and prohibited from relieving themselves. When the stadium was overcrowded, Montua appeared. The Jews were instructed to surrender their money and valuables before being congregated in the stadium's central area. In the afternoon, trucks arrived, transporting Jews to the Pietrasze forest. Police Battalion 316 members guarded the execution site, encircling it, as the victims, organized into smaller groups, were led to trenches previously dug by the Red Army. A firing squad of about 30 policemen executed the Jews at these sites. The corpses were sprinkled with a thin layer of earth.

Most of Police Battalion 316 and one company from Police Battalion 322 partook in the executions and securing the site, overseen by SD and Sicherheitspolizei officers. At one juncture, Bach-Zelewski appeared, encouraging the members of the firing squad by emphasizing their role "in the war against global Jewish Bolshevism and International Judaism." Also, he asserted that "anyone who believed in the German leadership could not fail to carry out the assignment." As dusk descended, truck spotlights illuminated the execution site, but proved ineffective. Maj. Waldow was compelled to halt the execution. Those not shot were guarded overnight. They met the same fate the next day, alongside those Jews who were not transported to Pietrasze on previous day and stayed overnight at the stadium.

No victims managed to escape. Usually, the estimates indicate that on July 12–13, members of police battalions 316 and 322 killed between 4,000 to 4,500 Jews in the Pietrasze forest. However, varying sources cite differing counts of victims, estimating their number at 1,200 – 3,000, 2,600, 3,000 or even 5,300. Among the murdered was Jakub Szapiro, a journalist, writer, teacher, and advocate for Esperanto. Surviving Jews referred to these victims as the "Saturday victims".

== Aftermath ==
During the initial two weeks of German occupation, an estimated 6,500 to 7,000 Jews were killed in Białystok.

On July 12, with reaction on the start of the Saturday's Action, representatives from the Judenrat pleaded at the Ortskommandantur for the release of those arrested. Rabbi Rosenmann was coerced at gunpoint to sign a statement alleging that the retreating Soviets had set fire to the Great Synagogue and Szulhojf, which the Germans purportedly extinguished. In exchange for freedom of the arrested, the Nazis demanded a contribution: 5 kilograms of gold, 100 kilograms of silver, and 2 million rubles.

The Judenrat initiated collections, with Białystok's Jewish community willingly participating, hoping to secure the return of their loved ones. The collected amount even exceeded the Nazis’ demand. However, upon delivering the contribution, the city's military governor declared that it could only prevent future 'actions,' alleging that those arrested on July 12 had already been sent for forced labor in Germany. The members of the Judenrat decided not to inform the Jews what they had learned. Nevertheless, the truth soon has been revealed, sparking widespread outrage among the Jewish population. Mothers and wives of the victims protested outside the Judenrat's headquarters, and an independent committee formed to raise ransom funds for the Germans. Eventually, after several months, realizing the futility, the committee returned the collected money to the donors.

By July 26, the German authorities mandated that Białystok's Jews relocate to the designated ghetto area north of Kościuszko Square within five days. Simultaneously, all Poles were to vacate houses within the future ghetto boundaries. The ghetto was enclosed by a 2.5-meter-high wooden fence topped with barbed wire and sealed on August 1, confining around 43,000 Jews. This marked a temporary stability for the Jewish community for over a year. It lasted until February 1943, when nearly 8,000 Białystok's Jews were deported to Auschwitz and Treblinka, while another 2,000 were murdered within the ghetto.

On September 25, 1942, reports of the Nazis' atrocities on "Black Friday" were covered in the British daily "Manchester Guardian".

In July 1944, the Germans exhumed and incinerated the bodies of the Pietrasze forest victims. Post-war investigations uncovered seven mass graves and sixty-two individual graves at the site.

== Remembrance ==
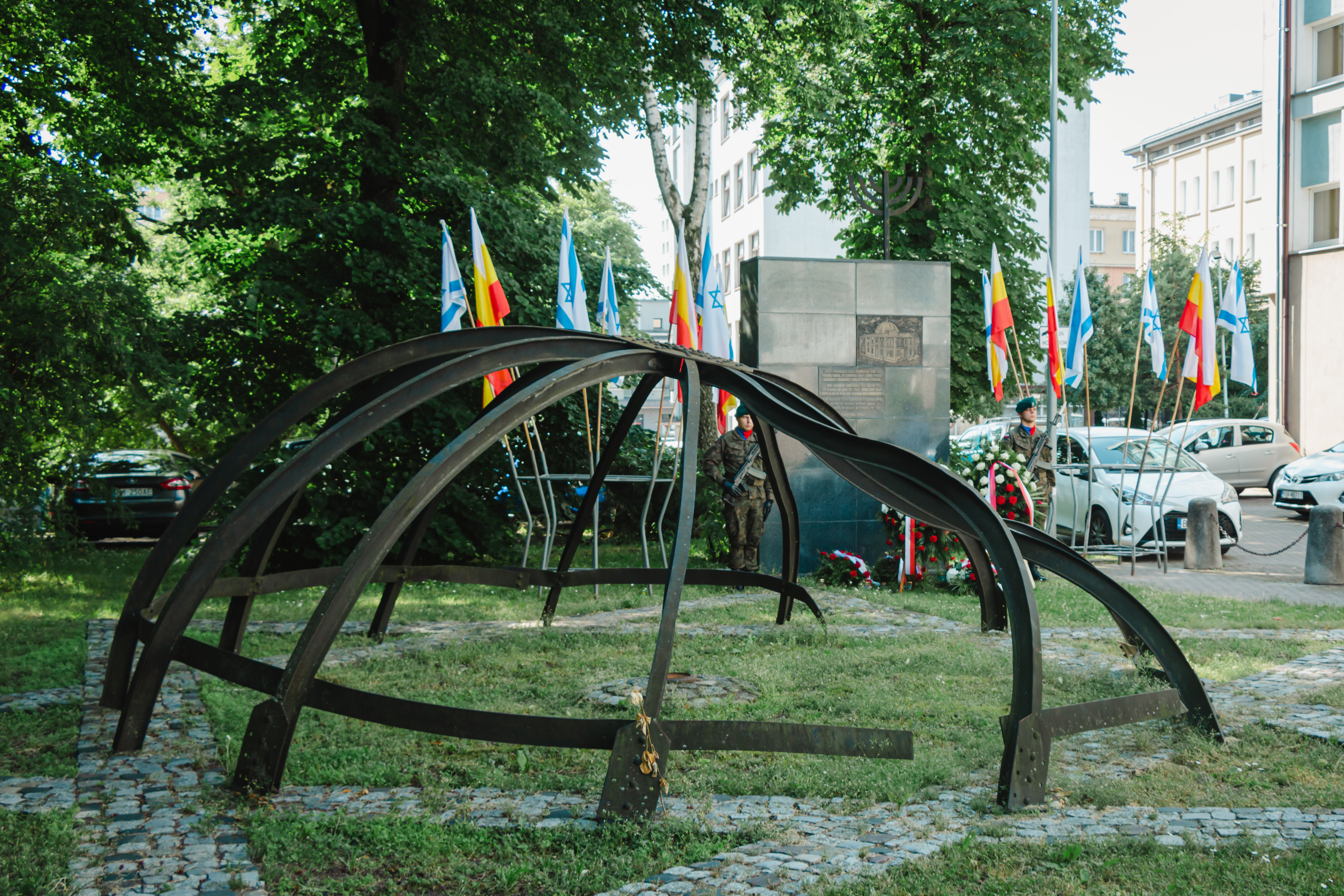
A monument commemorating the Great Synagogue in Białystok

After the war, the ruins of the Great Synagogue were demolished. The victims burned alive by the Germans on June 27, 1941, were initially commemorated by a small obelisk. On August 16, 1995, in the place where the Great Synagogue was located, in the area between Suraska Street and Legionowa Street, a new, more impressive monument was unveiled. It was funded by the Białystok Jewish diaspora and the Białystok municipal authorities. The primary feature consists of an iron skeleton symbolizing the synagogue's dome. The skeleton was placed on the Star of David, which was made of granite cubes. Nearby, there is a wall-shaped monument topped with a bronze menorah. Two brass plaques were hung on its front wall. One shows the building of the Great Synagogue, the other has an inscription in Polish, English and Hebrew:

Our splendid sanctuary fell victim to the flames on June 27, 1941. 2000 Jews were burnt alive in it by the German Nazi murderers.
Białystok 1995.

The victims of the "Black Friday" are also commemorated by a plaque on the wall of the building at Suraska 1 Street. There is an inscription on it in Polish and Hebrew, which states, however not particularly precisely:

In glorious memory of three thousand Jewish martyrs burned alive in a Great Synagogue in Białystok by Nazi murderers on June 24, 1941.
On the 15th anniversary of the Białystok Ghetto uprising: 16. VIII. 1943 – 16. VIII. 1958

The site of mass executions in the forest in Pietrasze was marked and fenced after the war. The victims are commemorated by a concrete monument in the shape of a black obelisk, standing on a plinth covered with white marble slabs. Two boards were hung on it, with an inscription in Polish and Hebrew:

In honor of the inhabitants of Białystok, the first victims of Nazism: 5,000 Jews murdered between July 3 and 12, 1941, and 100 Poles and Belarusians murdered later.

== Postwar trials in West Germany ==
In 1961, five members of Einsatzkommando 8 faced trial in Munich. Otto Bradfisch, the unit's commander, received a 10-year prison sentence for aiding the murder of 15,000 people. Wilhelm Schulz and Oskar Winkler were sentenced to 7 and 3.5 years, respectively. Others were acquitted.

Three former members of Police Battalion 322 faced trial in Freiburg in 1963 for involvement in mass murders of Jews in Białystok, Baranavichy, Minsk and Mogilev. All three were acquitted.

Hans Graalfs of Einsatzkommando 8 was sentenced in 1964 by the regional court in Kiel to three years in prison for aiding the murder of 760 Jews in Białystok and in other places. In the same year in Cologne, another member of this unit, Werner Schönemann, received 6 years in 1964 for aiding the murder of 2,170 Jews in Bialystok and elsewhere.

On October 10, 1967, the trial of twelve former members of the Police Battalion 309 began before the regional court in Wuppertal. They were all accused of participating in the massacre of Białystok's Jews on "Black Friday" on June 27, 1941. By the judgment of March 12, 1968, three defendants: Rolf-Joachim Buchs, Wilhelm Schaffrath and Friedrich Rondholz, were found guilty of murder and sentenced to life imprisonment. Six defendants were found guilty of aiding and abetting murder, but the court refrained from imposing a sentence on them. Three defendants were acquitted.

However, on appeal, the sentences against the convicted policemen were overturned by the Federal Court of Justice. This was mainly due to procedural reasons, i.e. the fact that one of the jurors had been found temporarily insane in the past. In addition, in the case of Friedrich Rondholz, the Federal Court overturned the judgment in the part relating to the murder of four Jews, while in relation to the part of the judgment relating to aiding and abetting the murder of 13 people, it found that the statute of limitations had expired. The second trial took place in 1973, again before the regional court in Wuppertal. This time, two defendants were found guilty only of aiding and abetting murder, and the sentences imposed were much lower. Wilhelm Schaffrath was sentenced to 6 years in prison, while Rolf-Joachim Buchs was sentenced to 4 years in prison.

Ten members of Police Battalion 316 faced trial in Bochum in 1968, but all were acquitted, claimed to have acted under duress.

== Culture references ==
The poem Rivkele di shabesdike ("Rivkele – the Shabbat's widow") by Pesach Kaplan is dedicated to the wives of men who were murdered during the Saturday's action of July 12–13, 1941.

== See also ==
- History of the Jews in Białystok
- Białystok during World War II

== Bibliography ==
- Arad, Yitzhak (2009). The Holocaust in the Soviet Union. Lincoln, Jerusalem: University of Nebraska Press, Yad Vashem. ISBN 978-0-8032-4519-8.
- Bender, Sara (2008). The Jews of Białystok during World War II and the Holocaust. Waltham, Hanover, London: Brandeis University Press, University Press of New England. ISBN 978-1-58465-729-3.
- Blood, Philip W. (2021). Birds of prey. Hitler's Luftwaffe, ordinary soldiers, and the Holocaust in Poland. Stuttgart: ibidem Verlag. ISBN 978-3-8382-1567-9.
- Browning, Christopher (1998). Ordinary Men: Reserve Police Battalion 101 and the Final Solution in Poland. New York: Harper Perennial. ISBN 0060995068.
- Browning, Christopher (2004). The Origins of the Final Solution: The Evolution of Nazi Jewish Policy, September 1939 – March 1942. Lincoln, Jerusalem: University of Nebraska Press, Yad Vashem. ISBN 9780803213272.
- Datner, Szymon (1946). Walka i zagłada białostockiego ghetta [The fight and destruction of the Białystok ghetto] (in Polish). Łódź: Centralna Żydowska Komisja Historyczna przy C.K. Żydów Polskich. Oddział w Białymstoku.
- Dean, Martin C.; Hecker, Mel (2012). Encyclopedia of Camps and Ghettos, 1933–1945. Vol. II: Ghettos in German-Occupied Eastern Europe. Bloomington, Indianapolis: United States Holocaust Memorial Museum, Indiana University Press. ISBN 978-0-253-00202-0.
- Dmitrów, Edmund (2002). "Oddziały operacyjne niemieckiej Policji Bezpieczeństwa i Służby Bezpieczeństwa a początek zagłady Żydów w Łomżyńskiem i na Białostocczyźnie latem 1941 roku" [Task forces of the German Security Police and Security Service and the beginning of the extermination of Jews in Łomża and the Białystok region in the summer of 1941]. In Machcewicz, Paweł; Persak, Krzysztof (eds.). Wokół Jedwabnego [On Jedwabne] (in Polish). Vol. 1: Studia. Warsaw: Instytut Pamięci Narodowej. ISBN 83-89078-08-2.
- Dobroński, Adam (2003). "Los mieszkańców Białegostoku na przełomie czerwca i lipca 1941 roku" [The fate of the residents of Białystok at the turn of June and July 1941]. In Milewski, Jan Jerzy; Pyżewska, Anna (eds.). Początek wojny niemiecko-sowieckiej i losy ludności cywilnej [The beginning of the German-Soviet war and the fate of the civilian population] (in Polish). Warsaw: Instytut Pamięci Narodowej. ISBN 83-89078-25-2.
- Kieliński, Marek; Koller-Szumska, Jolanta; Pieciul, Anna; Wicher, Sebastian (2017). Katalog białostockich pomników, tablic pamiątkowych i miejsc pamięci narodowej [Catalog of monuments, commemorative plaques and places of national memory in Białystok] (in Polish). Białystok: Urząd Miejski w Białymstoku. Departament Kultury, Promocji i Sportu. ISBN 978-83-924520-7-2.
- Longerich, Peter (2012). Holocaust. The Nazi persecution and murder of the Jews. Oxford: Oxford University Press. ISBN 978-0-19-960073-1.
- Matthäus, Jürgen (2007). "Controlled Escalation: Himmler's Men in the Summer of 1941 and the Holocaust in the Occupied Soviet Territories". Holocaust and Genocide Studies. 21 (2): 218–242. doi:10.1093/hgs/dcm037.
- Monkiewicz, Waldemar (1989). "Zagłada skupisk żydowskich w regionie białostockim w latach 1939, 1941–1944" [The extermination of Jewish communities in the Białystok region in 1939, 1941–1944]. Studia Podlaskie (in Polish). II.
- Rogalewska, Ewa (2008). Getto białostockie. Doświadczenie Zagłady – świadectwa literatury i życia [Białystok ghetto: The Holocaust experience – testimonies of literature and life] (in Polish). Białystok: Instytut Pamięci Narodowej. ISBN 978-83-924938-7-7.
- Westermann, Edward B. (2005). Hitler's police battalions. Enforcing racial war in the East. Lawrence, Kansas: University Press of Kansas. ISBN 978-0-7006-1371-7.
- Żbikowski, Andrzej (2006). U genezy Jedwabnego. Żydzi na kresach Północno-Wschodnich II Rzeczypospolitej: wrzesień 1939 – lipiec 1941 [At the origins of Jedwabne. Jews in the North-Eastern Borderlands of the Second Polish Republic: September 1939 – July 1941] (in Polish). Warszawa: Żydowski Instytut Historyczny. ISBN 83-85888-55-1.
