= Białystok Ghetto cemetery =

Jewish cemetery in the Białystok Ghetto, Poland

Białystok Ghetto cemetery Cemetery in Żabia Street
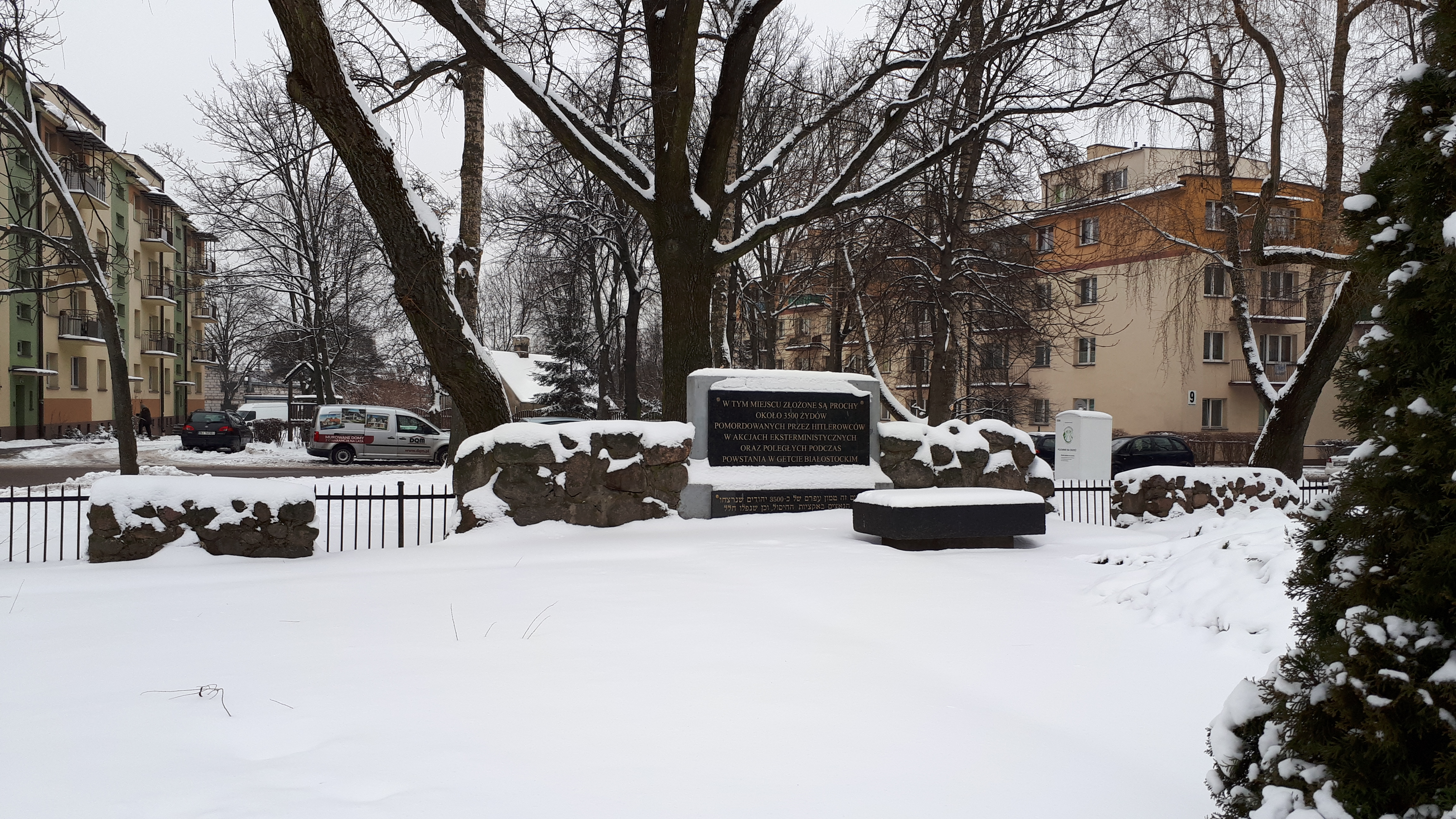
- Interactive map of Białystok Ghetto cemetery Cemetery in Żabia Street

Details
- Established: 1 August 1941
- Closed: 12 March 1964
- Location: Białystok
- Country: Poland
- Coordinates: 53.13794°N 23.14975°E
- Type: Civil
- Owned by: Białystok Ghetto Judenrat
- Size: 0.49 ha (1.2 acres)
- No. of interments: 3,500 (est.)

Białystok Ghetto cemetery (Polish: Cmentarz żydowski przy ul. Żabiej) was a Jewish cemetery in the Białystok Ghetto, located in the city of Białystok in north-eastern Poland.

== History ==
In June 1941, during Operation Barbarossa, the German Armed Forces entered Białystok. Following the "black friday" on which the Germans burned the Great Synagogue with hundreds of people inside it, they established the Bialystok Ghetto. While the active Jewish cemetery in the city already existed, it was outside the ghetto perimeter in Wygoda neighbourhood, and the Germans forbade Jewish people to bury their dead outside of the ghetto. Therefore, there was a need to find a solution to the burial problem, and the judenrat decided to establish a cemetery inside the ghetto territory. The cemetery was established on 1 August 1941, about two weeks after the establishment of the ghetto, and was the only cemetery to be established from scratch in a ghetto during the holocaust. About 3,500 people were buried here, most of them between 1941 and 1945, who were prisoners of the ghetto. and Chevra Kadisha (burial society) was active in the cemetery until the mass deportation that followed the Białystok Ghetto uprising in August 1943. Originally, the cemetery area was fenced with wire and partly with a fence. The tombstones were small and primitive, most of the matzevot were made of boards and covered with turf.

=== Post-war period ===
In the years 1945–1949, thanks to the help of the American Committee for Assistance to Białystok residents, the cemetery was fenced with a stone and brick wall with a gate. A mass grave with the bodies of 70 ghetto fighters was found then, located in a landfill next to the ghetto cemetery. The bodies were exhumed and then reburied, this time in the Jewish cemetery. While working on the garbage dump, they found another pit containing the bodies of women, children and infants who had been removed from the hospital and shot by the Nazis during the liquidation of the ghetto. Pathologists determined that some of the women and children were buried alive. At the beginning of the 1950s, there were 3,560 individual tombstones and six mass graves in the cemetery, each 20-meter wide. In 1959, the cemetery was locked with a padlock and the key was kept by a caretaker. The first signals about the possibility of destroying the cemetery at Żabia Street appeared as early as 1953 in connection with the construction of a housing estate. At that time, it was planned to move the remains to another place and leave only a memorial plaque here. However, the Białystok branch of the Social and Cultural Association of Jews in Poland protested. In a letter of protest to the PZPR Provincial Committee, members of TSKŻ wrote the following:

This cemetery is a national reliquium, besides it is not a cemetery in the usual sense of the word, but a place of execution for thousands of Polish citizens, and as you know it has not yet moved a single place execution of the Nazi occupation; on the contrary - everyone, probably the most modest piece of land on which executions took place or fallen patriots in the fight against the occupier is worshipped.

At the Office for Religious Affairs, the Jewish Historical Institute intervened in this matter, warning against desecration of memory and destruction of works of art, and warning about the propaganda effect of such a decision. Finally, at that time, the Board of Construction of Houses and Settlements "ZOR" stated that for now the cemetery area is not needed, but expressed the opinion that "one should gradually prepare for its liquidation in the coming years due to the fact that the area north of Pilsudskiego Avenue (then called 1st of May Avenue). The last burials took place in the cemetery in 1964 when it was formally closed by the decision of the Minister of Municipal Economy of March 12, 1964. By decision of the Presidium of the Voivodeship National Council in Białystok of June 1964, the area was "intended for other purposes". At the beginning of July 1966, the council and representatives of TSKŻ agreed to adopt the concept of developing the North II housing estate, and the cemetery was to become a "monument of the martyrdom of the Białystok society". The appraisal report from April 1970 determined TSKŻ compensation in the amount of PLN 180,758. Inn the autumn of 1970 the Provincial Conservator of Monuments and the State Provincial Sanitary Inspector gave their consents to the liquidation of the cemetery.

At one of the meetings in October 1970 with the participation of Edward Rajber representing the Main Board of TSKŻ, it was agreed that the cemetery area would be developed in the form of a square with a separate commemoration site. It was indicated: "The place of commemoration should be in the form of one grave with an artistic accent". The deputy chairman of the Voivodeship National Council in Bialystok obliged the chairman of the Municipal National Council to an artistic solution in the form of a passive rest greenery, while commemorating the place of extermination of Jews.

The Social and Cultural Association of Jews in Poland in the second half of November 1970 agreed to the free transfer of the ghetto cemetery at the same time – as can be read in archival documents – considering it necessary to exhume the corpses to a common grave before proceeding with cleaning works. the exhumation was carried out by the Department of Construction of the Municipal Greenery Board in Bialystok. All matzevot were removed, of which stone were used to harden roads in the city. The order to liquidate the cemetery came from the PZPR Central Committee. However, the heads of the Provincial and Municipal National Council signed the decisions.

The exhumation lasted from February 25 to April 5, 1971. All the remains of the corpses were placed in wooden coffins and buried in a mass grave located at this cemetery in accordance with the development project and a park was created in its place, with a monument dedicated to the heroes of the ghetto uprising in August 1943 located in it. It was founded by the city's Jewish community around 1946 and has the form of an obelisk with a Star of David. During the liquidation of the cemetery, it was hidden and put back in its place after 1989. In the part adjacent to Proletariacka Street there is a mausoleum with a plaque from 1971 commemorating the interment of the ashes of approximately 3,500 Jews murdered by the Nazis in exterminist actions and killed during the ghetto uprising. In 2023 the remanents of the former wall surrounding the cemetery was restored and declared monument of heritage.
