= Chorszul Synagogue (Białystok) =

Former synagogue in Białystok, Poland

- Polish: Synagoga Chorszul
- Location of the former synagogue in Podlaskie Voivodeship

Religion
- Affiliation: Orthodox Judaism (former)
- Rite: Nusach Ashkenaz
- Status: Destroyed

Location
- Location: Żydowska street, Białystok
- Country: Poland
- Interactive map of Chorszul Synagogue
- Coordinates: 53°08′00″N 23°09′27″E

Architecture
- Type: Synagogue architecture
- Established: 1834
- Destroyed: 1943
- Materials: Brick

The Chorszul Synagogue in Białystok (from Yiddish: Chóralna), known as the Zabłudowski Synagogue was a synagogue that was located in Białystok at Białówny Street (at those times Żydowska Street, in the centre of the new Jewish district.

== History ==
The initiator of its reconstruction was, among others, Mark Zamenhof, the father of L. L. Zamenhof. Presumably, the Zamenhof family attended this particular synagogue during their stay in Białystok. It was built in 1834 as the first modern synagogue in the city, on Żydowska Street next to Kościuszko Market Square (with the Great Synagogue not far from other side of the square. The main benefactor was the Zabłudowski family, which is the reason for the synagogue commonly called the "Zabludowski Synagogue". In the late 1850s, it was the first synagogue in the city where a choir began to sing, hence its official name "Chorszul". At that time, a famous cantor was also brought from Kiev. The building was made of brick, had two storeys, and was covered with a gabled tin roof. It had characteristic semicircular windows in the prayer hall.

During World War II, the synagogue was in the ghetto's territory. during the liquidation of the ghetto following the uprising there in 1943, the Germans burned the synagogue. After the end of the war, it was not rebuilt and in the plot where it stood there is an apartment building.

== See also ==
- Chronology of Jewish Polish history
- History of the Jews in Poland
- List of active synagogues in Poland
