= Nomer =

Nomer may refer to:

- Nomer Tamid, synagogue in Poland
- Sovkhoz Nomer Shest, town in Armavir, Armenia
