= Osiedle Piaski, Białystok =

Piaski
- District (osiedle) of Białystok
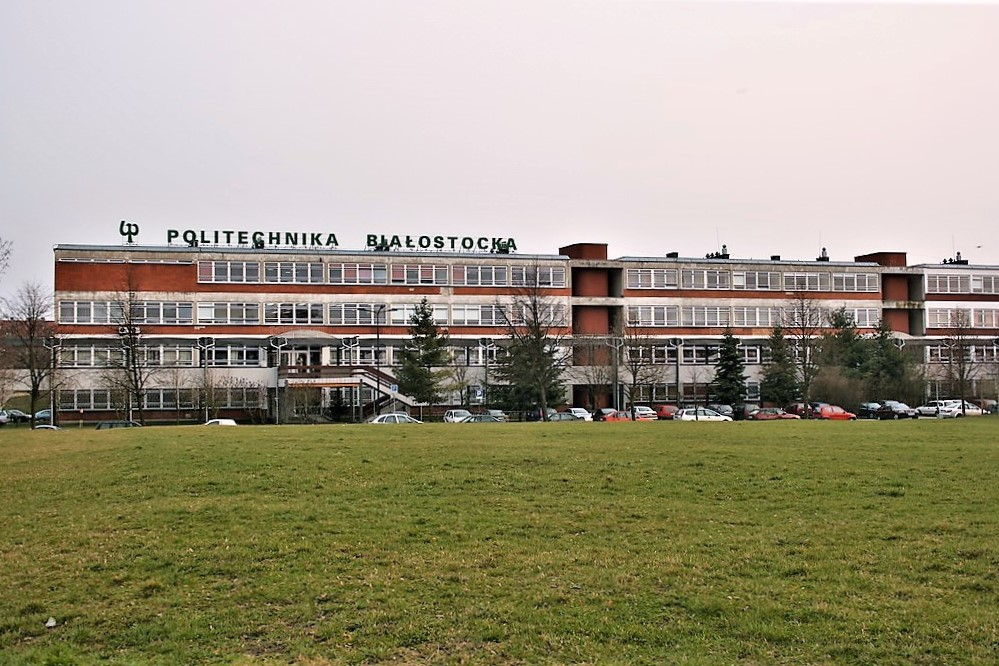
- Bialystok University of Technology

- Location of Osiedle Piaski within Białystok
- Coordinates: 53°7′30″N 23°9′18″E
- Country: Poland
- Voivodeship: Podlaskie
- County/City: Białystok

Area
  - Total: 1.293 km^{2} (0.499 sq mi)
- Time zone: UTC+1 (CET)
  - Summer (DST): UTC+2 (CEST)
- Postal code: 15-xxx
- Area code: +48 85
- Website: http://www.bialystok.pl

Piaski is one of the districts of the Polish city of Białystok.

== History ==
Piaski first mentioned in a census from 1825 kept in Grodno archives as a sandy area with empty properties behind Supraska Gate. People moved to the area during the 19th century. In the second half of the 19th century, Jews were grouped on the southern outskirts of the Great Synagogue, from where they were also close to the markets. Further, up to Zwierzyniec Forest, the authorities marked out the area for the barracks. Up to the Second Polish Republic, Piękna street connected the Sienna Market Square with the Fish Market (Rynek Rybna), which was reached by the streets: Wołodyjowskiego with Plutonowa and Wojskowa with Piwna (M. Skłodowskiej-Curie). The tsarist regiment took the place of the garrison command, and barracks of the cavalry reserve centers also stood in that area. The Fish Hall and adjacent shops, workshops and storehouses survived World War II. But with the establishment of the People's Republic of Poland, private trade was forbidden. Piwna street was to renamed Aleja Pochodów, was widened to connect the edifice of the party's Provincial Committee with the courts which and trade unions and the hospital complex. Later the street was changed to Skłodowskiej-Curie Street.
