= Otto Bradfisch =

German economist, jurist, and SS officier (1903–1994)

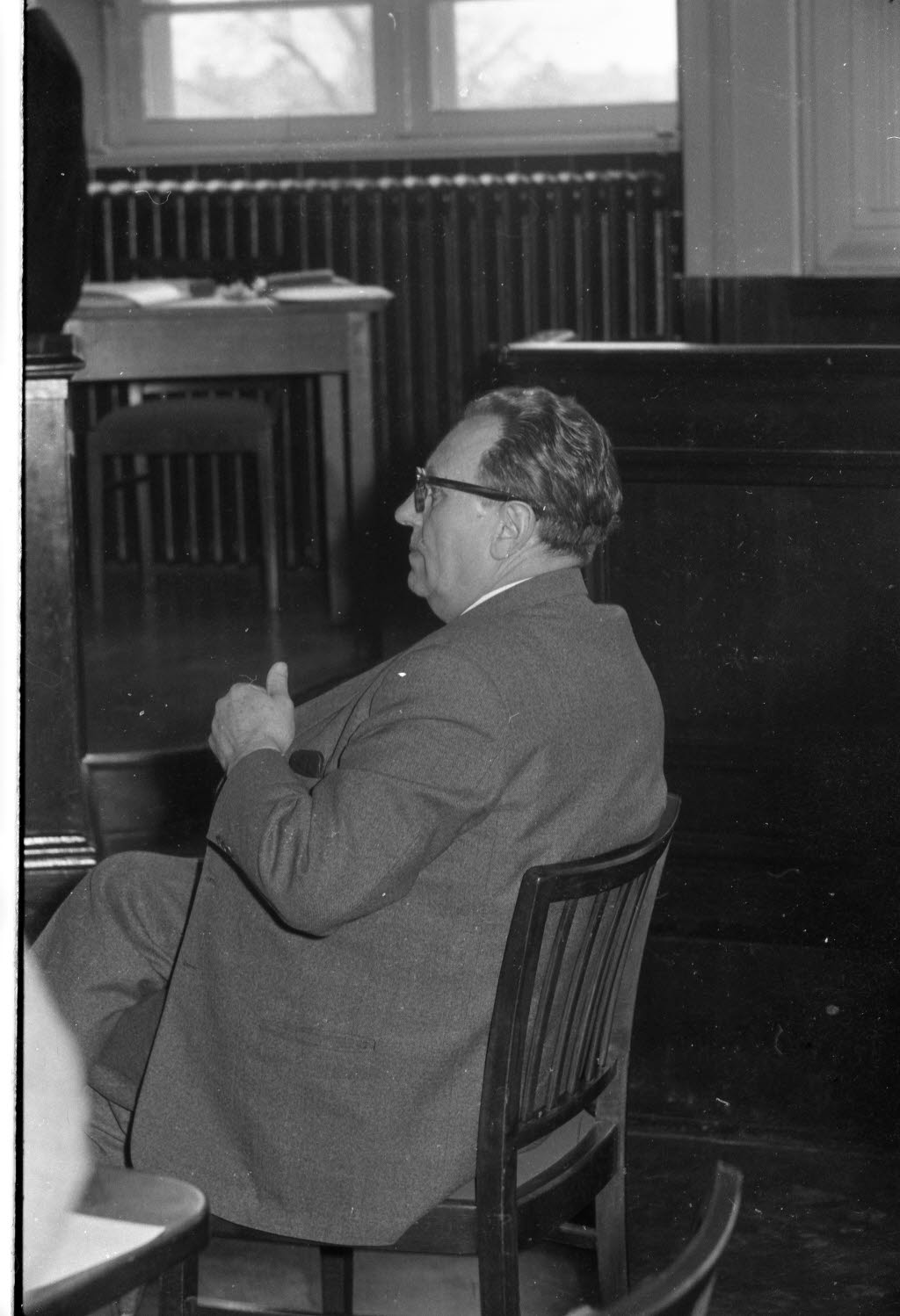
Otto Bradfisch

Otto Bradfisch (10 May 1903 – 22 June 1994) was an economist, a jurist, an SS-Obersturmbannführer (Lieutenant colonel), leader of Einsatzkommando 8 of Einsatzgruppe B of the Security Police (Sicherheitspolizei or SiPo) and the SD, and Commander of the Security Police in Litzmannstadt (Łódź) and Potsdam.

== Early life and education ==
Dr. Otto Bradfisch was born in 1903 in Zweibrücken (then Palatinate district of Kingdom of Bavaria) as the second of grocery salesman Karl Bradfisch's four children. In Kaiserslautern he went to the Volksschule for four years and afterwards to the Gymnasium. In 1922, he did the school-leaving examination. At the Universities of Freiburg, Leipzig, Heidelberg, and Innsbruck Bradfisch studied economics. He ended his studies with a graduation to Dr. rer. pol. at the University of Innsbruck in 1926. Afterwards, Bradfisch studied law in Erlangen and Munich to improve his professional chances in difficult times. He sat for the state law examination on 17 February 1932, and the second on 20 September 1935.

== Professional and political career ==
Engaged first as an Assessor in the Upper Bavarian government, he was transferred to the Bavarian State Ministry for the Interior as a Government Assessor. Already by 1 January 1931, Bradfisch had joined the NSDAP with membership number 405,869. At the time he was studying in Munich, he was working as the acting local group leader (Ortsgruppenleiter) in Munich-Freising. In 1936, he joined the National Socialist Motor Corps. On 26 September 1938, he joined the SS (membership no. 310,180) as an SS-Obersturmführer (First lieutenant).

At an acquaintance's urging, Bradfisch applied for service in the Gestapo, into which he was hired on 15 March 1937. He was also given the acting leadership of the State Police post at Neustadt an der Weinstraße. Appointed a government adviser on 4 November 1938, Bradfisch stayed there until his assignment as leader of Einsatzkommando (EK) 8, attached to Einsatzgruppe (EG) B of the Security Police and the Sicherheitsdienst in June 1941.

== Leader of Einsatzkommando 8 of Einsatzgruppe B ==
Einsatzgruppe B was one of four Einsatzgruppen deployed for special operations during Operation Barbarossa, the attack on the Soviet Union. This Einsatzgruppe was led by SS-Brigadeführer (major general) Arthur Nebe, Chief of the Kripo, and was subdivided into Einsatzkommandos 8 and 9, and the Sonderkommandos 7a and 7b, as well as the Vorkommando Moskau. It was also attached to Army Group Middle.

The Einsatzgruppen tasks were established by oral Führer order and a written directive from Reichssicherheitshauptamt (RSHA) Chief Reinhard Heydrich on 2 July 1941, to secure areas to the advancing army's rear and the performance of standard police tasks until the establishment of a civil administration in the conquered eastern areas, and the "special handling of potential opponents", i.e. their elimination. Heydrich identified these in order: "all Comintern functionaries (all professional Communist politicians), the higher, middle and radical lower functionaries of the Party, the Central Committee and the regional and area committees, people's commissars, Jews in Party and state posts, various radical elements (saboteurs, propagandists, snipers, assassins, agitators, and so on)". This circle of persons was later expanded to all "politically intolerable elements" among prisoners of war and eventually all "racial inferiors" such as Jews, Gypsies, and "Asiatic elements".

Meant at first to take the job as staff consultant on Einsatzgruppe B's staff, Bradfisch took part in a major discussion at the Pretzsch Border Police School at which Heydrich and the Chief of RSHA Department IV (Gestapo), Heinrich Müller, explained to the Einsatzgruppe and Einsatzkommando leaders in all plainness their task. After the presentation of this instruction, which without doubt was recognized by all participants as wrongful and criminal, the originally foreseen leader of Einsatzkommando 8, the provisional leader of the Liegnitz State Police post Ernst Ehlers appealed to Einsatzgruppe B's leader Nebe with the wish to be released from this duty. Nebe complied with Ehlers's wish and appointed Bradfisch as his replacement. Bradfisch had no doubts about the work that lay ahead. The Einsatzkommando 8, led by Bradfisch from the beginning of the Russian Campaign onwards, consisted of six subdivisions varying in strength, each under an SS leader. The unit's total strength was about 60 to 80 men. In view of his official position as government adviser and Leader of the Neustadt an der Weinstraße State Police post, Bradfisch, as the EK 8 leader, was awarded the rank of SS-Sturmbannführer (major).

With the onset of the Russian Campaign on 22 June 1941, the EK 8 followed Army Group Middle through Białystok and Baranavičy in late 1941 to Minsk. On 9 September 1941 they reached Mahilyow where, given the slowdown that the German offensive had suffered, and the forthcoming winter, plans were made for a lengthy stay.

As to the ways of doing things whereby the EK 8 fulfilled the tasks that it was ordered to do, and which were more or less the same for every Einsatzkommando, the Munich State Court I in their ruling of 21 July 1961 at the Einsatzgruppe Trial portrayed them as follows:

In carrying out the order to annihilate the Jewish eastern population as well as other population groups considered to be racially inferior, and functionaries of the Russian CP, the EK 8, after crossing the demarcation line between the German Reich and the Soviet Union established in the year 1939, conducted ongoing shooting campaigns, in which mainly Jews were killed. (…) The gathering of the Jews in each of the effected places – as the usage of the time had it, the "maintenance" ("Überholung") – happened in such a way that the locality or street was surrounded by some members of the Einsatzkommando and then next the victims were driven together out of their houses and flats randomly by other Kommando members. The victims were then either transported right after being taken prisoner by truck to the shooting places already established beforehand, or held prisoner in suitable buildings (schools, factories) or other localities, until they were then shot the next day or a few days later. Already in these so-called "through-combing actions" ("Durchkämmungsaktionen") it came to bodily mishandling and in the odd case even to killing old and sick people who could not walk, and who were thus shot in their dwellings or right nearby.

The mass shootings took place in each case outside the "maintained" town or locality, where natural hollows, abandoned infantry and artillery posts, and above all armoured dugouts or mass graves dug by the victims themselves, served as execution places. At the executions that happened in the first few weeks of the Russian Campaign, only men aged about 18 to 65 were killed, whereas women and children were often spared at first. Beginning in August 1941 at the latest, however – already at the shootings in Minsk – they furthermore switched over to killing men and women of all ages, and even children. After completing the preparations, the victims, who were offloaded from the trucks right near the shooting pit and who had to sit on the ground awaiting the further events, were either brought forth to the pit by EK 8 members, or driven forth through laneways built by Kommando members to the pits, if needed with the help of blows. After they had first given up their things of value and pieces of clothing that were in good condition, unless this had already happened when they were taken prisoner, they then had to lay themselves with their faces to the ground, and were then killed with shots to the back of the head. In the earlier shooting campaigns (Białystok, Baranavičy, Minsk) but also occasionally even later on the occasion of major actions, execution squads were put together from Einsatzkommando members and policemen assigned to them, which in strength matched in each case the numbers of the groups of people driven to the shooting pit, or in the odd case even possessed twice the strength, so that in each case, one shooter or two shooters had to shoot at one victim. These shooting squads, which were armed with carbines(Karabiner 98kurz), were put together mostly from policemen and commanded by a platoon leader from the police unit put under him who was appropriate to the command given him by the EK 8 leadership. At these executions undertaken by shooting squads it occasionally came to pass that the victims had to put themselves at the edge of the pit, to be then "shot into" the pit.

In the course of the deployment, there was an ever greater changeover from shooting with rifle salvos to killing the intended people with single shots or machine pistols. The grounds for this lay in the claim that shooting with rifle salvos took a relatively long time, and moreover, the force of the shots delivered from the shortest distance was so violent that the shooting squad and sundry other persons participating in the action were sprayed with the killed people's blood and bits of brain, a circumstance which raised the mental burden of the men on the execution squad, which was already extraordinary anyway, that often there were misses and therefore the victims' suffering was prolonged.

The shootings with machine pistols were carried out as a rule in such a way that the Einsatzkommando members in the pit designated to carry out the execution went along the row of persons to be shot, killing one victim after another with shots to the back of the head. This method of execution inevitably led to some of the victims having to wait a longer time lying on badly or not at all buried dead bodies, with certain death before their eyes, until they themselves were given the death shot. In some cases, the killing of the victims was carried out in such a way that they were brought to the shooting place double-quick, thrust into the pit, and then, while they were falling, they were shot. While at the shootings in Białystok and Baranavičy, and partly still at the executions in Minsk, the dead bodies were more or less well covered with sand or earth before the next group were driven or led to the pit, such a covering only seldom took place in the later shooting campaigns, so that the victims that followed, if they were shot in the pit, each had to lay themselves down on the dead bodies of those who had just been killed. But also in cases in which the dead bodies had had sand or earth thrown over them lightly, the victims that followed noticed their killed fellow doomed people's bodies, whose parts often jutted out of the thin sand or earth covering. A doctor was not called in to the executions. If one of the victims still showed signs of life, he was administered an aftershot with a pistol by a Kommando member, usually a leader.

The execution places were each sealed off by Einsatzkommando members or police officials subordinate to them, so that for the people right near the shooting pit waiting for their deaths there was no possibility of escaping their doom. In fact, they had the opportunity – this circumstance demonstrates a particular intensification of their suffering – to hear the crack of rifle salvos or machine pistol shots and in the odd case to observe the shootings to which neighbours, friends and kin fell victim.

Given this ghastly fate, the victims often broke out in loud crying and moaning, prayed loudly and tried to reaffirm their innocence. Some, however, went quietly and calmly to their deaths.

=== Criminal actions ===
Bradfisch was as leader of the EK 8 responsible for all measures and executions. To some extent, he led the executions, and in the odd case even shot with his own hand. Some examples follow:

- Białystok, two shooting campaigns of at least 1100 Jews and Bolshevist functionaries
- Baranavičy, two shooting campaigns of at least 381 Jews
- Minsk, seven Jew shootings of at least 2000 people
- Mahilyow, eight shooting campaigns of at least 4100 Jewish men, women and children as well as Russian prisoners of war
- Babruysk, major action, in which at least 5000 Jewish men, women and children were shot.

About his Einsatzkommando's activities, Bradfisch had to report to the higher-ranking Einsatzgruppe B, who sent the RSHA these reports compiled with those from the other Einsatzkommandos. There, the individual reports were condensed into the so-called event reports by Office IV A.

=== Security Police and SD Commander ===
Bradfisch was active as EK 8 leader until 1 April 1942. On 26 April 1942 he was transferred to Łódź – which the Nazis called Litzmannstadt – and appointed chief of the State Police post there. In this function he was also responsible for deporting Jews to the Chełmno extermination camp. He became the area Commander of the Security Police and the SD in summer 1942. In autumn of the same year came his provisional appointment as Łódź's mayor. In this capacity he was also promoted to high government adviser and SS-Obersturmbannführer (Lieutenant colonel) on 25 January 1943.

=== War's end ===
After the city's evacuation due to the war in December 1944, Bradfisch worked as Commander of the Security Police and the SD in Potsdam for the last few months of the war. As the Red Army closed in, Bradfisch managed to escape westwards, procuring for himself a Wehrmacht pay book with junior officer Karl Evers's name on it. He first found himself in American custody as a prisoner of war, but was then transferred to British custody, and by August 1945, he was released.

== Post war ==
Until 1953, Bradfisch managed to hide his true identity by using the name Karl Evers. He worked first in farming and later in mining. When Bradfisch became an insurance agent in Kaiserslautern, eventually for Hamburg-Mannheimer as a regional director, he once again began using his true name. On 21 April 1958, Bradfisch was temporarily seized and sentenced by the Munich State Court I on 21 July 1961 to 10 years in labour prison (Zuchthaus) for the crime, committed with Bradfisch as part of a group, of abetting collaborative murder in 15,000 cases. In 1963, he was sentenced to 13 years in prison. Bradfisch and his wife, who were married on 23 November 1932, had three children, the youngest of whom, a girl born in Łódź, died as they were fleeing the Soviet army advance.

Bradfisch was released from prison in July 1969. He died in Seeshaupt in 1994, aged 91.

== Literature ==
- Krausnick, Helmut und Wilhelm, Hans-Heinrich: Die Truppe des Weltanschauungkrieges. Die Einsatzgruppen der Sicherheitspolizei und des SD 1938 - 1942, Stuttgart 1981, Deutsche Verlags-Anstalt, ISBN 978-3-421-01987-5
- Klein, Peter (publisher): Die Einsatzgruppen in der besetzten Sowjetunion 1941/42. Die Tätigkeits- und Lageberichte des Chefs der Sicherheitspolizei und des SD, Edition Hentrich, Berlin 1997 ISBN 978-3-89468-200-2
