= Jewish Cemetery, Białystok =

Cemetery in Polancd

Bagnówka Cemetery Cemetery in Wschodnia Street
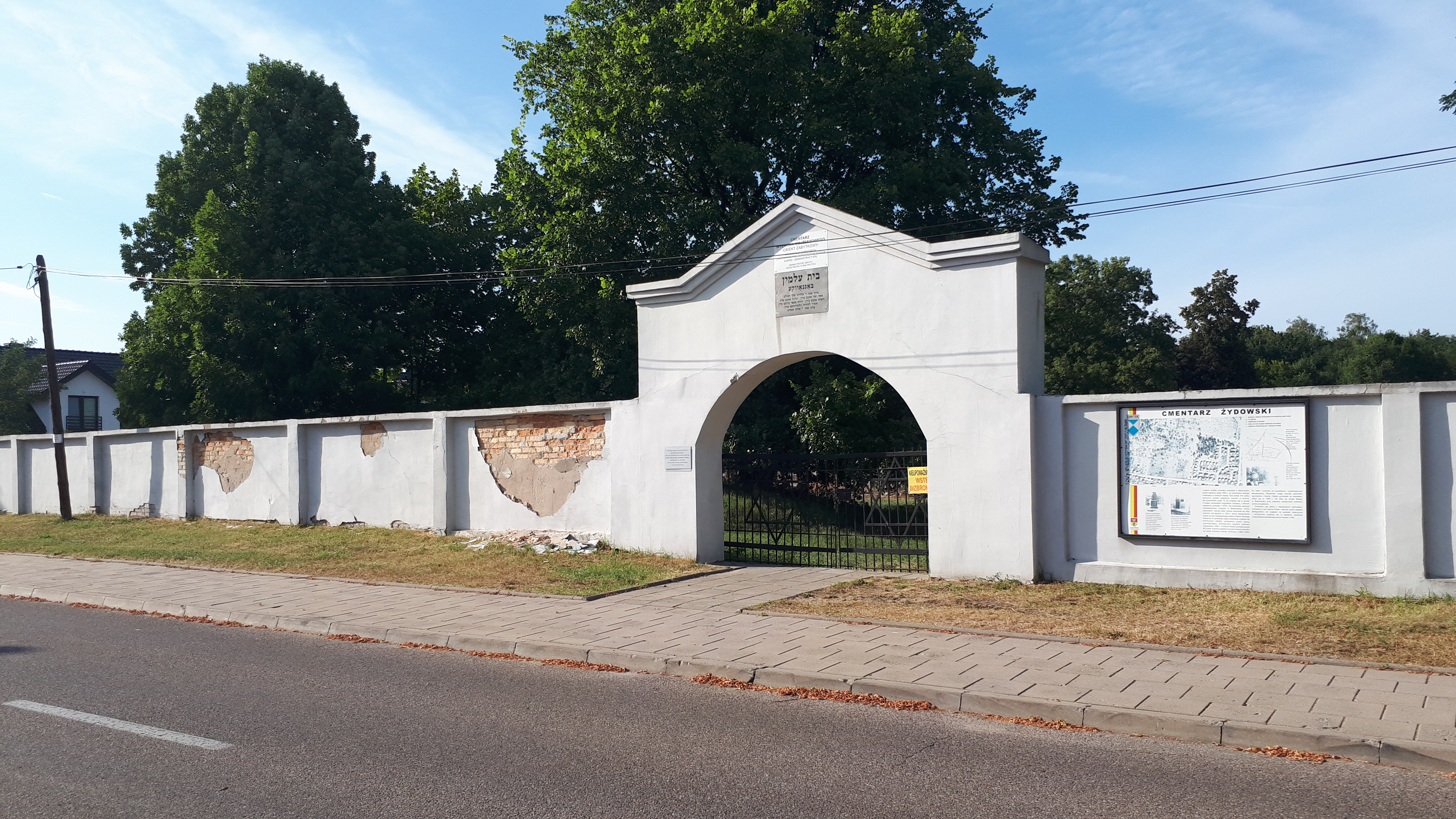
- Main entrance to the cemetery
- Interactive map of Bagnówka Cemetery; Cemetery in Wschodnia Street

Details
- Established: 1891
- Closed: 17 July 1973
- Location: Białystok
- Country: Poland
- Coordinates: 53.1502°N 23.1962°E
- Type: Civil
- Owned by: Białystok Jewish Community
- Size: 12.5 ha (31 acres)
- No. of interments: 6,000 (est.)

The Jewish Cemetery in Wschodnia street, Białystok, Podlaskie Voivodeship, Poland was established in 1891, after the closure of the old cemetery, the Rabbinic Cemetery, on Kalinowskiego Street. The Jewish cemetery is a listed heritage monument.

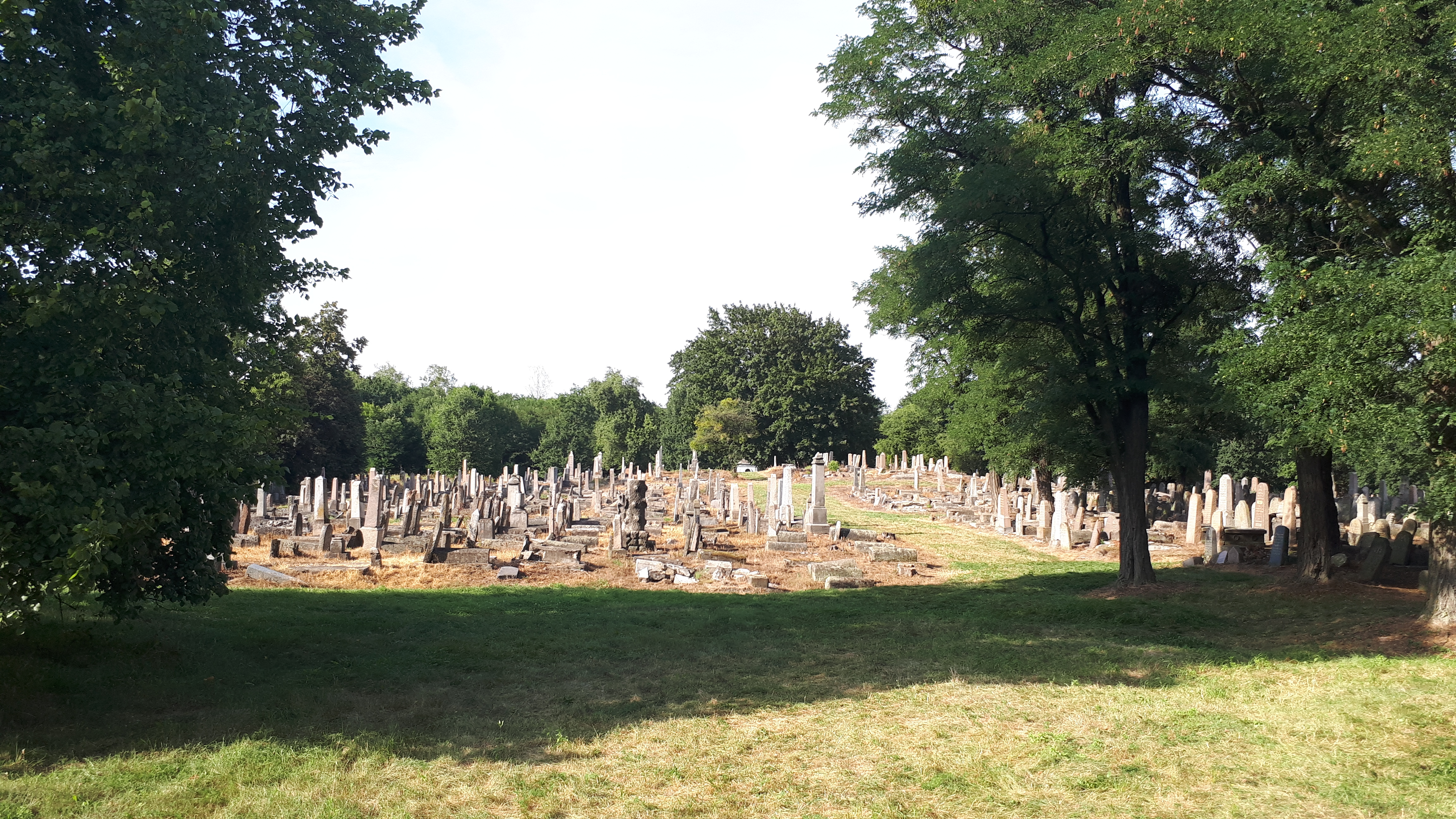
Overview of the cemetery

This is the only surviving Jewish cemetery in Białystok and one of the largest Jewish cemeteries in Northeastern Poland. The brick boundary wall encloses an area of 12.5 hectares, which contains around 6,000 Matzevah – the oldest of which dates to 1891. The matzevoth are made of marble, granite, limestone, and sandstone. There are inscriptions in Hebrew, Yiddish, Polish, Russian, and German.

The foundations of two buildings are found on the cemetery grounds just inside the main entrance: the Tahara house and the house of the warden and gravedigger. The last burial took place in 1969. On 17 July 1973, the cemetery was closed.

There is a monument in the cemetery commemorating around 90 Jews who died in a pogrom undertaken by the Russians in 1906, which was unveiled before the Second World War. The names of the victims in this pogrom are carved on black stone. This monument also records the names of victims of two massacres in 1905.

== Restoration ==
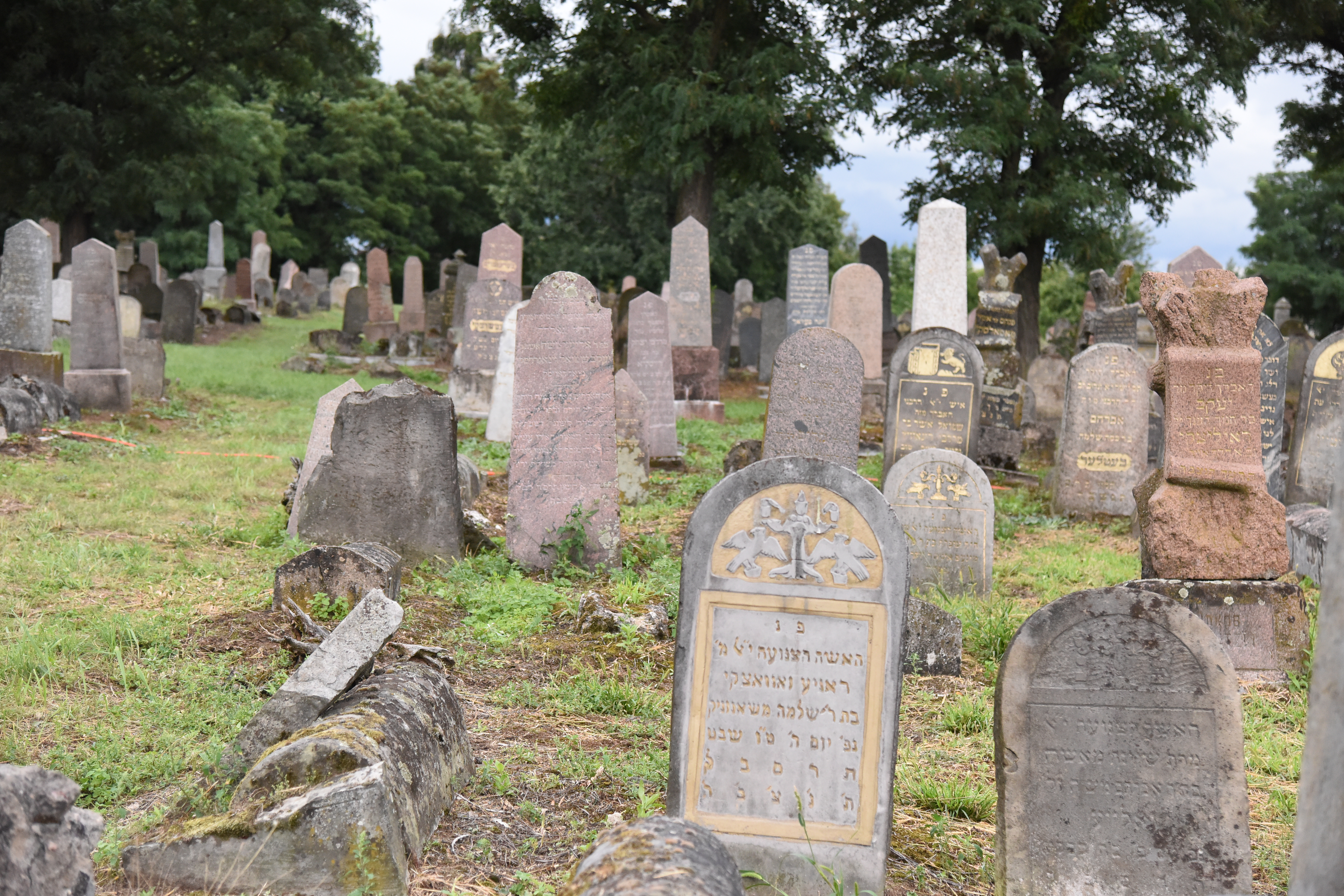
Tombs in the cemetery

In 1993–95, Samuel Gruber and Phyllis Myers published A Report to the United States Commission for the Preservation of America's Heritage Abroad. Jewish cemeteries were surveyed in respect to size, number of tombstones, and challenges to preservation. A decade earlier, mapping, and initial documentation near the main entrance by Podlaskie Voivodeship conservator's office was undertaken. The topographic map that was prepared also highlighted landmarks on this cemetery. Photography of sections 1–5 was ostensibly completed. In 1991, the earliest clean-up effort at Bagnówka Jewish Cemetery was organized by Białystok photographer and volunteer, Miroslaw Szut, with further volunteers from the Netherlands. From the late 1990s to around 2012, local historian Tomasz Wisniewski engaged in substantial documentation of Bagnówka Cemetery, assisted in translation by Heidi M. Szpek and later Sara Mages.

With the establishment of Centrum Edukacji Obywatelskiej Polska-Izrael in Bialystok, care for Bagnówka Jewish Cemetery took on new directions under its president, Lucy Lisowska. A large gap in the cemetery's western wall was repaired. An extensive wall adjoining the Catholic Cemetery was rebuilt, and the wall on Wschodnia Street was repaired and repainted. These projects were funded by Samuel Solasz, a holocaust survivor from Białystok and the City of Białystok. Since the early 2000s, clean-up efforts have been initiated and maintained through Centrum, often with the assistance of local school children. Restoration efforts also ensued with volunteering international students from the United States, Israel, and Europe, coordinated by Centrum’s Lisowska and with onsite materials and strategies for restoration provided by Białystok volunteer, Waldemar Mierzejewski. From 2010 to 2018 Aktion Suhnezeichen Friedensdienste (ASF) held eight summer camps devoted to restoration, coordinated by Lisowska and Mierzejewski. In 2010, Heidi M. Szpek began collaborating with Centrum and in 2013 with ASF in their efforts at Bagnówka.

In 2012 and 2013, Centrum and ASF worked to restore Sections 3 and 5, just inside the main entrance, at right. Mierzejewski further developed and constructed a pulley-chain tripod device to assist in lifting stones. A simpler version had been constructed by ASF team leader Dr. Andreas Kahrs in 2010. In 2013, ASF and Centrum, in consultation with Szpek, prepared a tour of Bagnówka. In 2014, Szpek guided ASF and Centrum in major restoration efforts on the Memorial Complex. In 2015, efforts turned to Sections 1, 2 and 7, just inside the main entrance, at left, with some additional work at the Memorial Complex. In total, these restoration efforts cleaned several hundred stones whose details were added to the Bagnówka database, but less than 100 were re-erected, due to weight and equipment limitations.

Since 2016, restoration of the cemetery took on a new direction, drawing on the vision and expertise of stone contractor Josh Degen and his wife, Amy Halpern Degen, of Massachusetts (USA). On an educational tour in 2015, Amy Degan, who has ancestral roots in Białystok and nearby Sokółka, came upon ASF working on the cemetery. As a stone contractor by trade, Josh Degen recognized the potential of utilizing mechanized equipment in the cemetery for a faster and more effective restoration. The Degens along with Massachusetts friends, Howie and Paula Flagler, founded the US NGO 501(c)(3) Białystok Cemetery Restoration Fund (BCRF) in 2016. Gathering a group of volunteers from the United States, Germany, and Israel, along with local Poles, 301 tombstones were restored in 2016, 349 in 2017, and 310 in 2018 during one-week Summercamps.

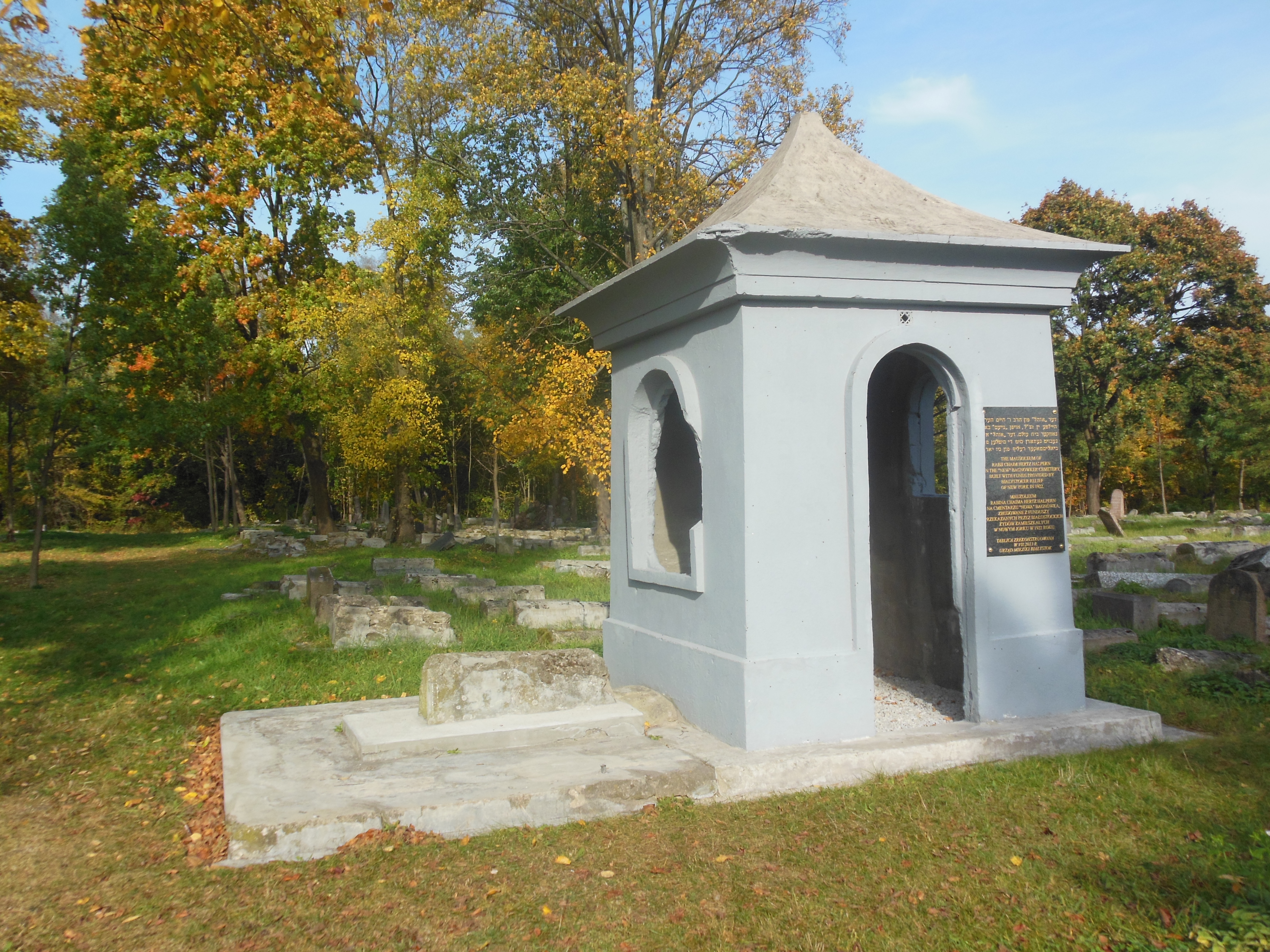
Mausoleum for Rabbi Chaim Herz Halpern

Szpek and her husband, photographer Frank Idzikowski, joined BCRF volunteers. In 2018, Szpek joined the BCRF Board. In 2019, over 400 stones were restored in a ten-day summer camp. Mierzejewski served as the local liaison for the BCRF until his death in 2018. The position of Białystok liaison was then taken up by another long-time volunteer, Dr. Andrzej Końdej. The COVID-19 pandemic in 2020 temporarily halted restoration work but local volunteers organized by Dr. Andrzej Ruszewicz, Przez, Społeczne Muzeum Żydów Białegostoku, coordinated a cleanup effort in 2021. In 2022, Andrzej Rusewicz joined the Board of the BCRF. The uncertainty of the post-COVID-19 pandemic world and the onset of the Russian invasion of Ukraine necessitated postponement of a formal summer camp until 2023. However, in the summer of 2022, the first formal workshop on the cemetery by BCRP Board Members and volunteers took place. Nearly twenty local volunteers learnt best practices in cemetery restoration, restoring nearly 65 matzevoth by hand. BCRF Board Members also met with key individuals and organizations related to the restoration work and projects.

In August 2022, 123 boulder-style and one megalithic granite stele were also extracted from a mound, located on Boya-Zelenskiego Street, on the unused land that belongs to Bagnówka Cemetery. They date from 1809–1852, suggesting their provenance is the Rabbinic Cemetery (c. 1781–1900) now buried beneath Central Park in Białystok. Prior to 1831, no other cemetery existed for Bialystok's Jewish community. This mound of matzevoth with human remains has long been known, dumped in this area in the 1960s amidst construction of the Communist Party Headquarters in Białystok. They are now temporarily stored within Bagnówka Cemetery, with the goal of creating a memorial with these matzevoth in an area adjoining Central Park in Białystok that was once part of the Rabbinic Cemetery. The human remains were reinterned on Bagnówka Cemetery and a memorial stone is planned for them.

== Notable burials ==
- Chaim Herz Halpern (d. 1919), Rabbi
