= Nomer Tamid Synagogue =

Destroyed synagogue in Białystok, Poland

- Polish: Synagoga Nomer Tamid w Białymstoku; Hebrew: בית כנסת נומר תמיד
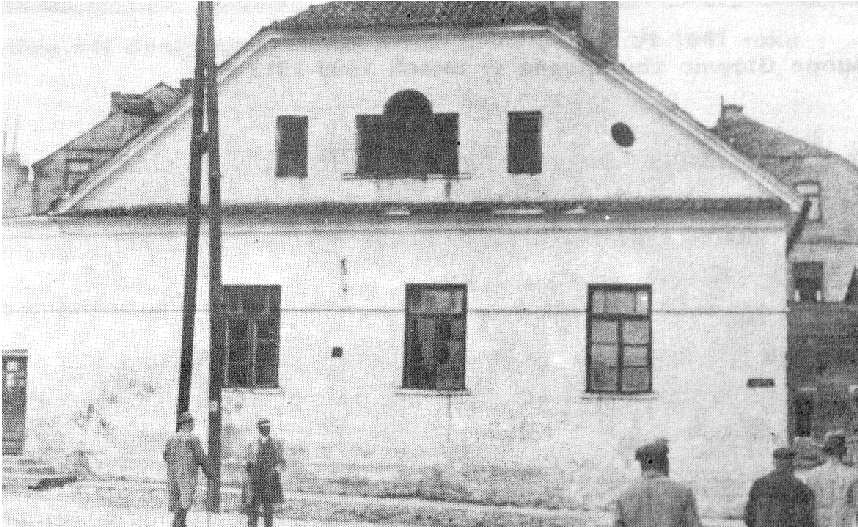
- The former synagogue, c. 1905

- Location of the destroyed synagogue in Podlaskie Voivodeship

Religion
- Affiliation: Orthodox Judaism (former)
- Ecclesiastical or organizational status: Synagogue (c. 1703–1939)
- Status: Destroyed

Location
- Location: Bóżniczej Street, Białystok, Podlaskie Voivodeship
- Country: Poland
- Interactive map of Nomer Tamid Synagogue
- Coordinates: 53°07′51″N 23°09′27″E

Architecture
- Type: Synagogue architecture
- Style: Wooden synagogue
- Funded by: Jan Klemens Branicki
- Completed: 1703 or 1711
- Destroyed: 1939
- Materials: Timber

The Nomer Tamid Synagogue (Polish: Synagoga Nomer Tamid w Białymstoku; Hebrew: בית כנסת נומר תמיד, lit. 'Synagogue of the Eternal Flame'), also known as the Nomer Tamid Beth Midrash or Ner Tamid Beth Midrasz, was a former Orthodox Jewish congregation and wooden synagogue, that was located in Białystok, in the Podlaskie Voivodeship of Poland.

Completed in 1703 or 1711, the synagogue served as a house of prayer until World War II when it was destroyed by Nazis in 1939.

Funding for the building was provided by Jan Klemens Branicki. The former synagogue was located on Bóżniczej Street, across from the Old Synagogue and the Great Synagogue.

== Gallery ==
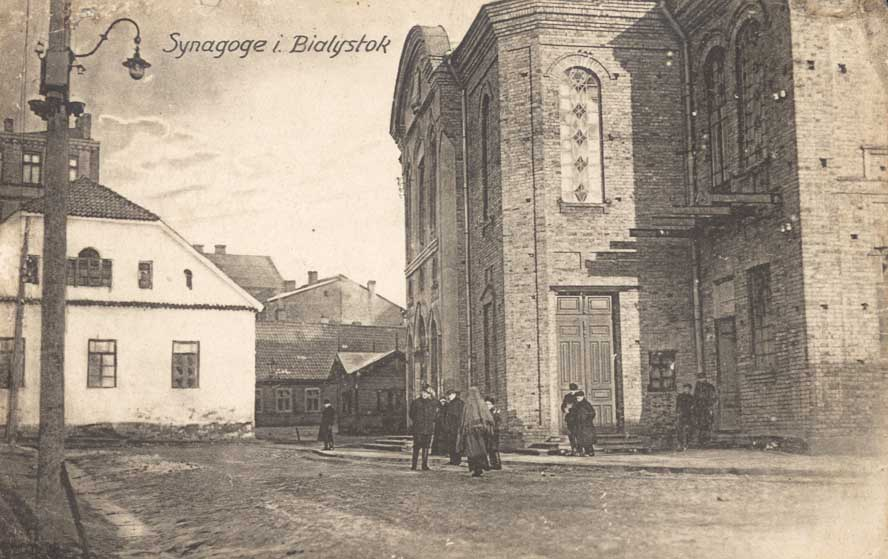
The Great Synagogue and Nomer Tamid

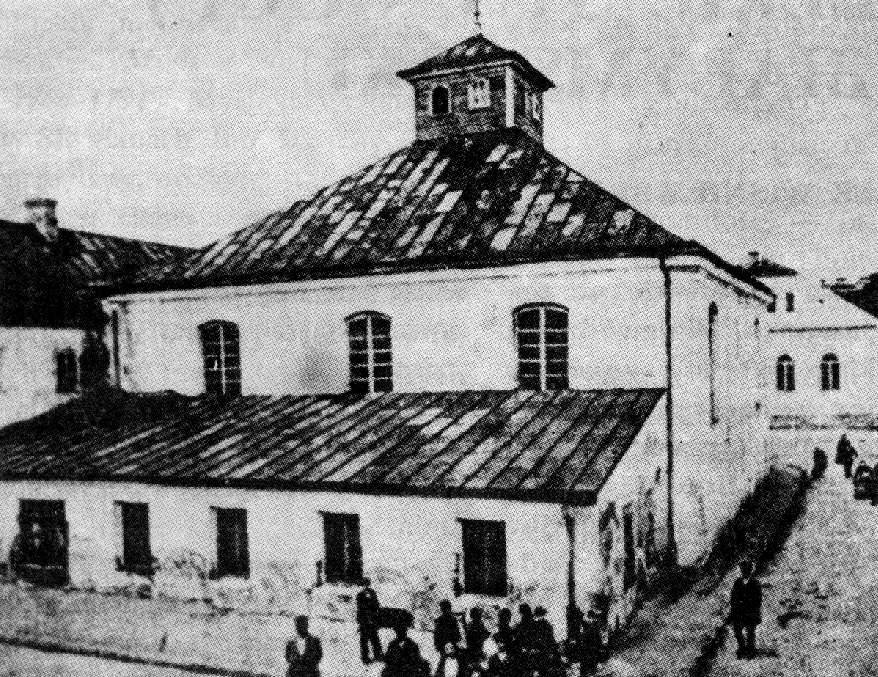
The Old Synagogue, with Nomer Tamid viewable in the background

== See also ==
- History of the Jews in Poland
- List of active synagogues in Poland
- List of wooden synagogues
