= Sara Bender =

Israeli historian (1947/1948–2026)

- שרה בנדר
- Born: 1947 or 1948
- Died: 31 October 2026 (aged 78)
- Occupation: Historian

Academic background
- Education: Hebrew University of Jerusalem
- Thesis: Facing Death (1997)
- Academic advisors: Israel Gutman; Yehuda Bauer

Academic work
- Discipline: History
- Sub-discipline: Jewish-Polish history of WWII
- Institutions: University of Haifa

Sara Bender (Hebrew: שרה בנדר; 1947 or 1948 – 31 October 2026) was an Israeli historian. She was the editor of the journal Dapim: Studies on the Holocaust.

== Education ==
In 1994, she received her doctoral degree from the Institute of Contemporary Jewry at the Hebrew University of Jerusalem. Her dissertation focused on the Jews of Białystok during World War II.

== Career ==
From 1998, she taught in the Department of Jewish History at the University of Haifa, as an associate professor and later promoted to professor.

== Death ==
Bender died on 31 October 2026, at the age of 78.

== Works ==
- Mikhman, Dan; Gutman, Israel; Bender, Sara (2005). The encyclopedia of the righteous among the nations: rescuers of Jews during the Holocaust. Belgium. Yad Vashem.
- Bender, Sara (2008). The Jews of Bialystok During World War II and the Holocaust. UPNE. ISBN 978-1-58465-729-3.
- Bender, Sara (2018). In Enemy Land: The Jews of Kielce and the Region, 1939-1946. Academic Studies Press. ISBN 978-1-61811-871-4.
