= History of the Jews in Białystok =

History of the Jewish community of Bialystok (Hebrew: קהילת יהודי ביאליסטוק), the capital of Podlaskie Voivodeship in northeastern Poland, dates back to the mid-17th century. The local Jewish community grew rapidly, and from the beginning of the 19th century made up more than half of the entire population of Bialystok: until the First World War, Jews made up 66–75% of the city's population, but between the two world wars the proportion of Jews dropped to 50–60% of the residents.

The great development of the city and the Jewish community in it, is related to the development of the textile industry in Bialystok in the 19th century. In 1850, the first Jewish factory was established, and as early as 1867, about half of the 89 weaving factories in Bialystok were Jewish-owned. The city developed a system of Hebrew, elementary and high schools, many youth movements, diverse from Jewish society, and also published a press in Yiddish.

With the German occupation in World War II, a Nazi ghetto was established for the Jews of Bialystok. During the last stages of the ghetto's existence, between 16 and 20 August 1943, a major revolt took place in the Białystok ghetto, led by members of the youth movements. Those that were not massacred escaped to the forests and continued to fight as partisans. The remaining Jews of Bialystok, about 50,000, were mostly sent to Auschwitz extermination camp, where few survived. Following the war, the Jewish population of the city continued to decline, and today the city no longer has an active Jewish community.

== History ==
=== Early years ===
Jewish settlement in Podlaskie Voivodeship dates back to the 15th century, when small groups of the Mosaic faith appeared in Bielsk Podlaski. In 1522, the Trakai voivode, Olbracht Gasztołd, brought nine Jewish families to Tykocin.

The village, founded in the first half of the 15th century, which later became the city of Białystok, fell into the hands of the Branicki family in 1685. Jews lived there as early as 1658, which is confirmed by the information in the chronicle of the board of the Jewish religious community in Tykocin. It is known that in 1661 the poll tax was paid by 75 Jews from Białystok. In 1663, the chronicle noted that 75 Jewish men and women of over 14 years lived in Bialystok. The Białystok Jews were initially subordinate to the community in Tykocin.

In 1691, a special district was separated for them in parts of the land obtained in 1691 from the Catholic Church, located near the southern frontage of the Central Market Square (the so-called "pastewnik" behind Suraska Street). On July 11, 1692, the legal situation of Jews in Bialystok was settled – they were allowed then to own a temple and cemetery. In the 1680s and 1690s a large group of Jewish settlers came from Brest-Litovsk. As a result, there were economic and religious tensions, and their accumulation was accusing Jews of ritual murder. According to Christian sources, six-year-old Gabriel, born on March 22, 1684, was abducted by the Jewish leaseholder from Zwierki – Szutka – to Białystok, where he was also killed. Regardless of the tensions, the Jewish population very quickly began to play an increasingly important role in the development of the city. heir economic position and demographic potential is evidenced by the construction in 1718 of a house of prayer (Beth midrash) in the city. A document issued by the Białystok jewish community (kehillah) dates back to 1711, in which it received PLN 1,000 from Teresa Wydrzycka for the construction of a synagogue, in exchange for which the community was to pay 10% of the sum transferred annually, and after the death of the borrower, interest was to be reduced by 25%.

At the beginning of the 18th century, the Jews were separated from the Białystok municipal authorities and were subject directly to the superior castle authority. Within the kahal, the Białystok Jews had an extensive official structure, which was reformed by Izabela Branicka in 1777. The Jewish community was to choose for the whole year and for each month separately the "senior year" and "senior month" who managed the community. On the other hand, finance was entrusted to the "driller" who chose taxes, paid installments on the sums of money located in the kahal. As usual, all activities should take place in the bet midrash, under the general supervision of the court authority. In order to protect against embezzlement, the kahal cash register had three locks, one key for it was a drill, senior year and month senior. Jews had separate craft features, in 1777 it was a tailor, bakery, Cyrillic and furrier guild. The rabbi, according to the owners' will, was obliged to consent to the wedding. The court authorities ordered them to check the candidates in terms of their property. The future husband had to run or have money to set up his own business (e.g. trading by setting up a stall), or he should be professionally prepared for paid work (acquiring skills in a craft).

The Jewish community administration kept three books – the first financial concerned the kehilla's revenues and expenses; in the second, all kehilla officials were enrolled; the third court contained protests, demonstrations and documentation of civil and criminal proceedings. In internal disputes between Jews, a kahal court (presided over by a senior year and senior month) or a clergy court (headed by a rabbi) was used, during which Talmudic law was used. If the subject of the claim exceeded 500 Zloty, she was entitled to "Apellacya from the clergyman, Jewish and kehilla court of Tuteyes, according to the dawney of the act, she would always be free to the Tykockiey synagogue." This remnant of the tykocin kahal's sovereignty is interesting because formally the Białystok kahal gained independence as early as 1745, and in 1771 the commune gained authority over the Jewish People in 59 centers, including Choroszcz and Gródek.

By the 19th century the Jewish population lived mainly in the city center, by the Kościuszko market square, and also in the quarter between Lipowa Street and the Biała River, along Mikołajewska (currently Sienkiewicza street) and Suraska. The oldest part of the Jewish district, called Szulhof, inhabited mainly by Orthodox people, was concentrated around the main synagogue and was located in the southern part of Suraska street.

The second center of Jewish concentration and religious life was located near Kupiecka Street (now Malmeda Street), Żydowska Street (now Białówny street), Giełdowa street (now Spółdzielcza street) and Zielona street (now Zamenhofa street), and its center was a reformed Chorszul Synagogue. This area has developed chaotically with densely built wooden and stone buildings.

In the 19th century another two, poorer neighbourhoods of the city were developing Chanajki and Piaski (area of the Młynowa, Brukowa, Grunwaldzka, Kijowska, Krakowska, Marmurowa, Stoleczna, Sukienna, Mławska, Odeska, Cieszyńska, Angielska, Sosnowa, Czarna streets as well as Rynek Sienny).

=== Second Polish Republic ===
In the interwar period, Jews ceased to be the city's most numerous ethnic group, although they remained a large, distinct and conspicuous community. The reason for the reduction in the numerical proportion was the enlargement of the city's borders to create the so called "Greater Białystok" in 1919, incorporating surrounding villages with non-Jewish majority, to the city's jurisdiction. The Jews were very active in the political, social and cultural life in Bialystok during the Second Polish Republic. The emergency medical service appeared in pre-war Białystok thanks to the Jewish association Linas Hacedek. This organization, established at the end of the 19th century to provide help to poor Jews, quickly expanded its activities and began running clinics and pharmacies. It also set up a basement where it stored ice delivered to all hospitals. In 1928, "Linas Hacedek" in Białystok, headquartered at 3 Różańska street, launched an emergency medical service providing help in emergencies to all residents of the city, regardless of nationality and religion. Throughout the interwar period, Jews dominated in Białystok in the liberal professions.

==== Politics ====
The strong position of Jews and their parties in interwar Białystok is evidenced by the fact that in the years 1919–1930 in the elections to the Sejm, two of the first three places belonged to Jewish groups. In the years 1919–1927, the orthodox Jewish party was in first place, only giving way in the subsequent elections to the Nonpartisan Bloc for Cooperation with the Government, which during the Sanation enjoyed the greatest support in Białystok in the elections of 1930. The political situation in Białystok was complicated by the strong position of Jewish parties, which fought for dominance with Polish groups. There was also considerable fragmentation among them, but the center-right wing enjoyed the greatest influence, initially represented by the Mizrachi party, and later by the Bloc of National Minorities. On the left, the Bund enjoyed the greatest support. Over the years, the influence of conservatives decreased in favour of the left.

==== Education ====
The Torah education system in Białystok during the 1930s was unique in that the Cheder and the Mesivta Yeshiva were both in the same city and under the same educational system. Most other cities only had a cheder.

Jewish educational institutions that operated in Bialystok during the Second Polish Republic's existence:

Kindergarten	Location	Additional information
Przedszkole im. Jaldut	41c Piłsudskiego	Tarbut organization
Przedszkole Anny Halpern	Jurowiecka 17	
Przedszkole im. "Mendełe"	6 Kościelna	Zjednoczonych Szkół Żydowskich organization
Przedszkole Sory Kaleckiej	34a Sienkiewicza	
Przedszkole S. Pomeranc	50 Piłsudskiego	
Przedszkole T. Głasztejnówny	28 Nowy Świat	

Elementary school	Location	Additional information
Szkoła Lejzera Eksztejna	49 Kupiecka	
Cheder Henacha Szturmakiewicza	8 Mlynowa	
Cheder Hirsza Iliwickiego	1 Zabludowska	
Cheder "Mojryo" M. Halperina	1 Orlanska	
Elementarna Szkoła Hebrajska "Degel Isroel" A. Goldberga	36 Kupiecka	
Elementarna Szkoła Religijna "Jesodes Hatojra"	2 Fabryczna	
Hebrajska Szkoła Ludowa "Tarbut"	34 Kupiecka	
Hebrajska Szkoła Ludowa "Tarbut"	41 Piłsudskiego	
Hebrajska Szkoła Powszechna "Tachkemojny"	3 Szlachecka	
Meska Szkoła Hebrajska "Dwir" M. Bojarskiego	27 Kupiecka	
Prywatna Szkoła Religijna "Tora Wadaas"	42 Kupiecka	
Prywatna Szkoła Religijna "Ohel Mojsze" M. I. Bojarskiego	4 Kijowska	
Prywatna Szkoła Religijna "Ohel-Tora" J. Fabelinskiego	19 Kupiecka	
Prywatna Szkoła Religijna "Talmud Tora"	11 Piekna	
Prywatna Szkoła Religijna "Tora Tmima" I. M. Gutmana	29 Piłsudskiego	
Prywatna Szkoła Żenska Sz. Fajnzylbera	14 Zamenhofa	
Szkoła Dziewczat Stowarzyzenie Zydow Ortodoksow	47 Kupiecka Street	
Szkoła Hebrajska "Chinuch" Arona Guza	39 Piłsudskiego	
Szkoła Hebrajska "Cijon" D. Zakhejma i Ch. Cytrina	23 Sucha	
Szkoła Ludowa im. "Mendele"	6 Koscielna	
Szkoła Powszechna Meska Morducha Sacylera	17 Polna	
Żydowska Szkoła Ludowa im. B. Groser	18 Rabinska	
Żydowska Szkoła Ludowa im. Gan Jeladim	13 Zolta	
Żydowska Szkoła Ludowa "Zjednoczone Szkoł Zydowskie"	3 Branickiego	

Gimnasyums and Liceums were often attached in one compound:

Gimnasyum	Location	Additional information
Gimnazjum Hebrajskie	79 Sienkiewicza	
Gimnazjum Koedukacjyne D. Druskina	4 Szlachecka	
Gimnazjum Koedukacyjne Doktora Gutmana	2 Zwirki i Wigury	
Gimnazjum Koedukacyjne J. Zeligman i J. Lebenhafta	4 Sienkiewicza	

Liceum	Location	Additional information
Liceum przy Gimnazjum Zeligmana	4 Sienkiewicza	
Liceum przy Gimnazjum D. Druskina	4 Szlachecka	
Liceum przy Gimnazjum Doktora Gutmana	2 Zwirki i Wigury	

Other schools	Location	Additional information
Instytut Muzyczne Jeszywat "Bejs Josef"	14 Sienkiewicza	
Szkoła Muzyczna Leokadii Kahanówny	28 Sienkiewicza	
Szkoła Rzemieslnicza Żenska "ORT"	23 Kilińskiego	
Szkoła Rzemieslnicza Żydowska	41 Piłsudskiego	
Zjednoczenie Szkol Zydowskich	23 Fabryczna	

=== Second World War ===
In 1939 the area of Bialystok and the region came under the rule of the Soviet Union in accordance with the Molotov–Ribbentrop Pact. The city and the region were incorporated into the Byelorussian Soviet Socialist Republic.

==== German occupation and the Holocaust ====
On June 22, 1941 with the onset of Nazi Germany's offensive, there was great panic in Bialystok, which was then part of the Byelorussian Soviet Socialist Republic. The Red Army began to flee and shops were looted, and prisoners, including Jews, escaped from prisons. David Klementinowski, a Jewish man who lived in the city, wrote: "Everyone who can, escapes with the Russians. The streets are full of tragic sights. Families who have lived together for decades must separate. The Soviet army's warehouses are looted by people for food and the Poles attack the Jews. We are afraid to leave the house because no one In an environment that will maintain law and order".

On June 27, 600–700 people (2,000 according to another source) were forced into the Great Synagogue, which was then set on fire. About a dozen of people escaped from the synagogue with help from Polish caretaker Józef Bartoszko. About 2,000-3,000 Białystok Jews died that day.

The German forces occupied the city and established the Białystok Ghetto, a Nazi ghetto set up by the German SS between July 26 and early August 1941 in the newly formed District of Bialystok within occupied Poland. About 50,000 Jews from the vicinity of Białystok and the surrounding region were confined into a small area of the city, which was turned into the district's capital. The ghetto was split in two by the Biała River running through it (see map). Most inmates were put to work in the slave-labor enterprises for the German war effort, primarily in large textile, shoe and chemical companies operating inside and outside its boundaries. The ghetto was liquidated in November 1943. Its inhabitants were transported in Holocaust trains to the Majdanek concentration camp and Treblinka extermination camps. Only a few hundred survived the war, either by hiding in the Polish sector of the city, escape following the Bialystok Ghetto Uprising, or by surviving the camps.

=== Polish People's Republic ===
Out of over 40,000 Jews living in Białystok before the Second World War, about 6,000 survived it. About a thousand returned to Białystok after the war (including repatriates from the East, for whom Białystok was a stop on their journey), but a significant part left immediately because there was nothing left of their pre-war world.

The first politically motivated request for recognition of Jewish nationality and permission to travel to Israel "to fight the Arabs" was sent to the relevant authorities on June 8, 1967 from a student of the Witold Szer High School of Engineering. A significant part of the Białystok post-migration emigration did not reach Israel. They chose Sweden, Denmark or France, as well as Australia and the United States.

Antisemitic action on the wave of March 1968 events was weak in the city, because after the war, there were very few Jews in Białystok, especially in influential positions. For the most part, Białystok was inhabited by immigrant, mainly rural population who showed less political activity and conservative attitude, and were reluctant to engage in risky ventures. A much later event, the invasion of Czechoslovakia was much more experienced in the city, because the specter of war appealed to the inhabitants imagination more clearly than unclear personal competitions. There was no clear play inside the PZPR because the local party organization was weak and suffered from a shortage of staff rather than an excess of people with ambitions. The PZPR Białystok Voivodeship Committee was the executor of the Central Committee's decision and never showed much activity.

The Białystok Voivodeship Committee of the PZPR took action on March 2 in connection with student protests in Warsaw. Meetings with party activists, teachers, militiamen, meetings of secretaries of basic party organizations, school and plant directors, trade unions, and especially the basic party organization at universities, began to be organized "to learn facts and interpret them." The temperature of events in the capital has risen since the March 8 rally, but even then there was no great tension in Bialystok, and KW assessed the political situation in the province as "basically favorable". Greater propaganda activity began on March 13. On this day, Gazeta Białostocka wrote for the first time about the incidents in Warsaw, and the authorities began organizing mass meetings and protest rallies at workplaces and universities, usually ending with the adoption of a resolution. Around 300 such resolutions were adopted in the province, and 255 collective and many individual solidarity letters were sent to Władysław Gomułka. In a resolution adopted on March 18 at an extended meeting, the board of the Białystok branch of the Social and Cultural Association of Jews in Poland, among others it stated firmly: "The guarantee of Jewish existence in Poland is only socialism".

In Białystok, the place where the March accidents and their consequences became most felt was the Medical Academy. The victim of the antisemitic purge was professor Jakub Chlebowski, then the head of the 2nd Internal Medicine Clinic of the Medical Academy (in 1959–1962 the rector of this university). In March 1968, pro-Israel and pro-American statements were pointed out to him. Justifying the harmful effect on student youth, the rector Ludwik Komczyński made the request to remove him from the position of head of the clinic. On October 16, 1968 left for Holon, Israel, where he died of an accident in the following year. In the same year, professor Janusz Lesiński, head of the Dermatology Clinic, also lost his job at the Medical Academy on the wave of anti-Jewish purges. He was one of the organizers of dermatological treatment in the region, he conducted research on venereal diseases.

In March 1969, the SB detained in Białystok Marek Trokenheim, a former student of the University of Warsaw, who "while preparing for his trip to Israel, prepared, with the intention of deporting in hostile cells, materials on last year's events in March and the problems of the Jewish national minority in the Polish People's Republic". He eventually left to Denmark, was editor of Stockholm's "Polish News" and the vice president of the Congress of Poles in Sweden. Another case was of Sonia Rogowska, former head of the department of the Provincial Public Security Office. In 1968 she was removed from the PZPR. She was accused of supporting Israel's aggression and speaking hostile to the government of Communist Poland and the Soviet Union as well as for talking about discrimination against Jews in Poland, defending those removed from the party, and allowing her daughter to wear a Star of David badge. She eventually emigrated to Israel in 1981.

By the end of 1968 ten permits to travel to Israel were issued in Białystok. The following year, 58 people received such consent, and in 1970 only 25. In this group there were 3 members of the Polish United Workers' Party and 32 non-partisans, 17 representatives of the intelligentsia and 18 workers, 5 people with higher education, 11 with secondary education and 19 with primary education. It is difficult to get precise data on the emigration of Jews from Białystok, because after the March events official documents did not mention Jewish nationality, there were almost no Jewish institutions in the city that would keep such records, and many people "resigned" from their Jewishness, e.g. after the war did not return to its identity, displacing it or deliberately making such decisions.

At the beginning of the 1970s, around 60 people of Jewish descent counted in the Białystok Voivodeship, the vast majority of them in old age. As part of the end of the Jewish world in Bialystok, in 1970 the branch of the Social and Cultural Association of Jews in Poland was liquidated, and its chairman – Jankiel Ostryński left for Denmark. At the beginning of 1971, among others the ghetto cemetery at Żabia Street eventually ceased to exist. The remains of around 3,500 Jews were exhumed in order to build apartment blocks in Osiedle Sienkiewicza.

In 1983, the 40th anniversary of the ghetto uprising was celebrated again. It was organized by the vice-president of the city, Wacław Ostaszewski, who was called as "a promoter of continuing Jewish traditions in Białystok". Representatives of the city's local authorities came to the ceremony at the Ghetto cemetery, scouts raised a guard of honour at the memorial plaque. Representatives of TSKŻ were present with the chairman of the Jewish Committee, Adam Kwaterko, the Jewish Religious Union with Mozes Finkielstein, the State Jewish Theater and the editorial office of "Folks-Sztyme", and most of all participants of the fights: Szymon Datner, Regina Wojskowska, Marek Buch. There were speeches, visits to places commemorating the martyrdom of Jews and evening at the Białystok Philharmonic organized by the Patriotic Movement for National Rebirth.
