= Białystok Ghetto =

Nazi ghetto in occupied Poland

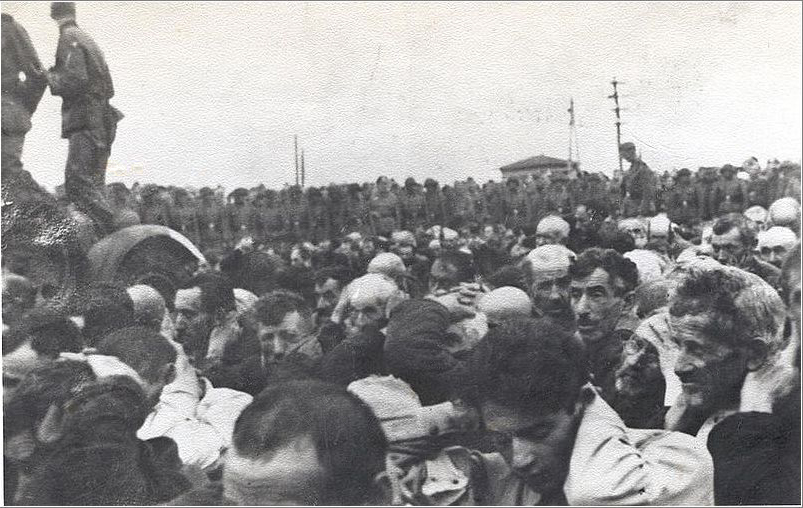
- Liquidation of the Białystok Ghetto, August 15–20, 1943. Jewish men with their hands up, surrounded by German security unit.

- Białystok Ghetto location northeast of Treblinka. Main ghettos marked with stars; death camps, with white-on-black skulls. Solid red line denotes the Nazi–Soviet frontier – starting point for Operation Barbarossa.
- Location: Białystok, German-occupied Poland; 53°08′17″N 23°09′33″E
- Date: July 26, 1941 – September 15, 1943
- Incident type: Imprisonment, mass shooting, forced labor, starvation, deportations to death camps
- Perpetrators: SS, Order Police Battalions, Trawnikis

The Białystok Ghetto (Polish: getto w Białymstoku) was a Nazi ghetto set up by the German SS between July 26 and early August 1941 in the newly formed District of Bialystok within occupied Poland. About 50,000 Jews from the vicinity of Białystok and the surrounding region were confined into a small area of the city, which was turned into the district's capital. The ghetto was split in two by the Biała River running through it (see map). Most inmates were put to work in the slave-labor enterprises for the German war effort, primarily in large textile, shoe and chemical companies operating inside and outside its boundaries. The ghetto was liquidated in November 1943. Its inhabitants were transported in Holocaust trains to the Majdanek concentration camp and Treblinka extermination camps. Only a few hundred survived the war, either by hiding in the Polish sector of the city, escape following the Bialystok Ghetto Uprising, or by surviving the camps.

== Background ==
Before World War II, the population of Białystok (with over 91,000 inhabitants according to 1931 census) was 43 percent Jewish. There were two Jewish cinemas in the city, several Jewish dailies, sports clubs, prominent political parties and a Jewish library with over 10,000 books. Cultural life was booming. Białystok was overrun by the Wehrmacht on September 15, 1939, during the German invasion of Poland, and one week later handed over to the Red Army attacking from the East, in accordance with the German–Soviet Frontier Treaty. On November 1–2, 1939, the prewar Białystok Voivodeship along with over half of the Second Polish Republic were annexed by the Soviet Union, becoming part of the Byelorussian Soviet Socialist Republic. During the Soviet occupation, Jewish companies and shops were closed, and Jewish social, educational, and political institutions were considered illegal. In addition many Jewish and Polish "capitalists" were deported by Soviet authorities to Siberia. Thousands of Jewish refugees flocked in from the German zone of occupied Poland. The city remained in Soviet hands until June 1941.

== Operation Barbarossa and German atrocities ==
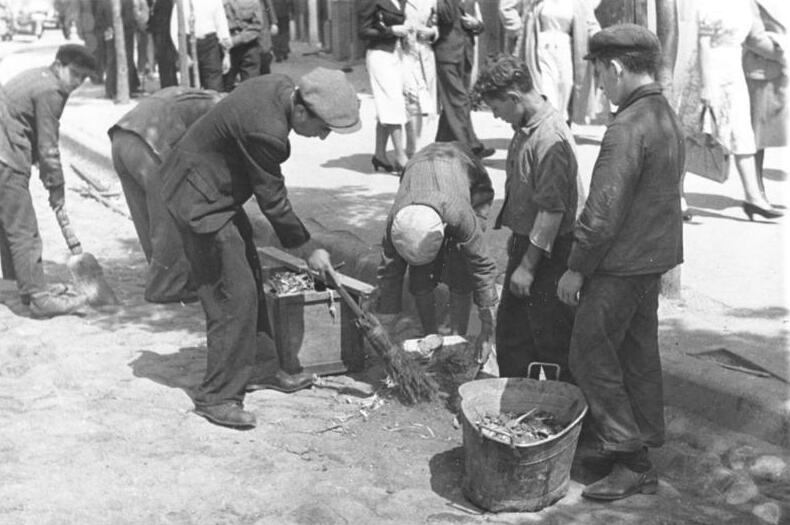
Białystok Jews forced by the Germans to sweep streets, June 1941

Nazi Germany attacked the Soviet Union (Operation Barbarossa) on June 22, 1941, and Wehrmacht took over Białystok on June 26–27. On the same day, the Police Battalion 309 arrived, tasked with inflicting terror upon the Jewish community. The first mass murder of Polish Jews was carried out during the so-called "Red Friday" of June 27, 1941, claiming the lives of up to 2,200 victims. The Great Synagogue was splashed with petrol and set on fire with approximately 700, up to 1,000 Jewish men locked in it; and burned down with a grenade thrown inside. The killings took place inside the homes of the Jewish neighborhood Chanajki and in the park, lasting until dark. The next day, some 20–30 wagon-loads of dead bodies were taken to new mass graves dug up on German orders along Sosnowa Street outside the city center. Major Ernst Weis of Battalion 309 got drunk and later claimed to have known nothing about what had happened. The official report submitted by his officers to General Johann Pflugbeil of the 221st Security Division (Wehrmacht), to which the battalion was subordinated, was falsified.

The Aktion was followed by the murder of about 300 Jewish intellectuals who were trucked to the Pietrasze fields on July 3. Battalion 309 left for Białowieża, and was replaced by Order Police Battalion 316 and 322 of Police Regiment Centre and were ordered to round up more Jews. On July 12–13, 1941, a mass shooting by the two battalions dubbed "Black Saturday" took place on the outskirts of Białystok. It is estimated that over 3,000 Jews herded into the municipal stadium – visited by Erich von dem Bach-Zelewski himself – were taken away and killed in antitank trenches. The total of over 5,500 Białystok Jews were shot in the first weeks of German occupation in the summer of 1941.

In addition to mass-murder operations carried out in the city, the new district became an early theatre of Einsatzgruppen operations as well. Each death squad followed an army group as they advanced east. Himmler visited Białystok on June 30, 1941, during the formation of the District of Bialystok and pronounced that there was a high risk of Soviet guerilla activity in the area, with Jews being of course immediately suspected of helping them out. The mission to destroy the "partisans" was assigned to Einsatzgruppe B under the command of Arthur Nebe, aided by Kommando SS Zichenau-Schroettersburg under Hermann Schaper, and Kommando Bialystok led by Wolfgang Birkner summoned from the General Government on orders from the Reich Security Main Office. In the early days of the German occupation, these mobile killing units rounded up and killed thousands of Jews in the district.

== Ghetto history ==
=== Formation ===
The ghetto was officially created on July 26, 1941, by the order of German military authorities. The transfer of Jews to a designated area was handled by the Judenrat (formed on June 30). All Poles who lived there were ordered to move out. Up to three Jewish families were placed in single rooms divided by curtains. There were two gates leading out of the ghetto initially, one on Jurowiecka and one on Kupiecka street. The ghetto encompassed the streets of Lipowa, Przejazd, Poleska and Sienkiewicza. It was closed from the outside on August 1, 1941, with 43,000 people trapped inside. The Judenrat, composed of 24 Jews, held its first meeting on August 2, and set up 13 departments split into divisions. Ephraim Barash (or Efraim Barasz in Polish), a mechanical engineer age 49, was elected as an acting president. The Council was chaired by Rabi Gedalyah (Gedalia) Rosenman. The soup kitchens were set up, along with infirmaries, schools, Jewish Ghetto Police stations, bathhouses, and other amenities. The Judenrat promoted hard work as key to survival. Its main obligation was to provide quotas of laborers for the Germans. Within a brief period of time the ghetto grew to over 50,000 Jewish captives. It was surrounded by a wooden wall topped by barbed wire, with three entrances manned by the Jewish Ghetto Police overseen by the Germans. Textile and armament factories were established with the help of the Judenrat. Food rations were strictly enforced.

=== First deportations ===
In September 1941 the Nazi authorities proclaimed that the number of Jews in Białystok was too large, and ordered their partial deportation to nearby Prużany (now Pruzhany, Belarus). The Judenrat prepared the list of targets. Deportations began on September 18 and went on for a month. The weakest and the poorest Jews numbering over 4,500 were sent away, others bribed their way out of it, with exorbitant amounts of money paid to the Judenrat employees. By January 18, 1942, the number of the Council officials (of all levels) had grown to 1,600 and up to 4,000 in June, mainly because of special bonuses and vouchers received for meat, legumes, jam, soap, flour and large amounts of coal for the winter. At the same time, food rations for the overall population were reduced severely, first to 500 grams of bread per day, and then to 300 grams, resulting in rampant hunger. In the words of survivor Riva Shinder, the ghetto became synonymous with "humiliating oppression, shootings [and] hangings." The smuggling of food from the outside was punished by death. In December 1941 a Jewish resistance organization was formed. It was led by Tadeusz Jakubowski and Niura Czerniakowska. Riva served as its secretary. They listened to radio broadcasts, wrote communiques, and operated a duplicating machine. They also carried out acts of sabotage in the factories.

=== Further deportations and uprising ===
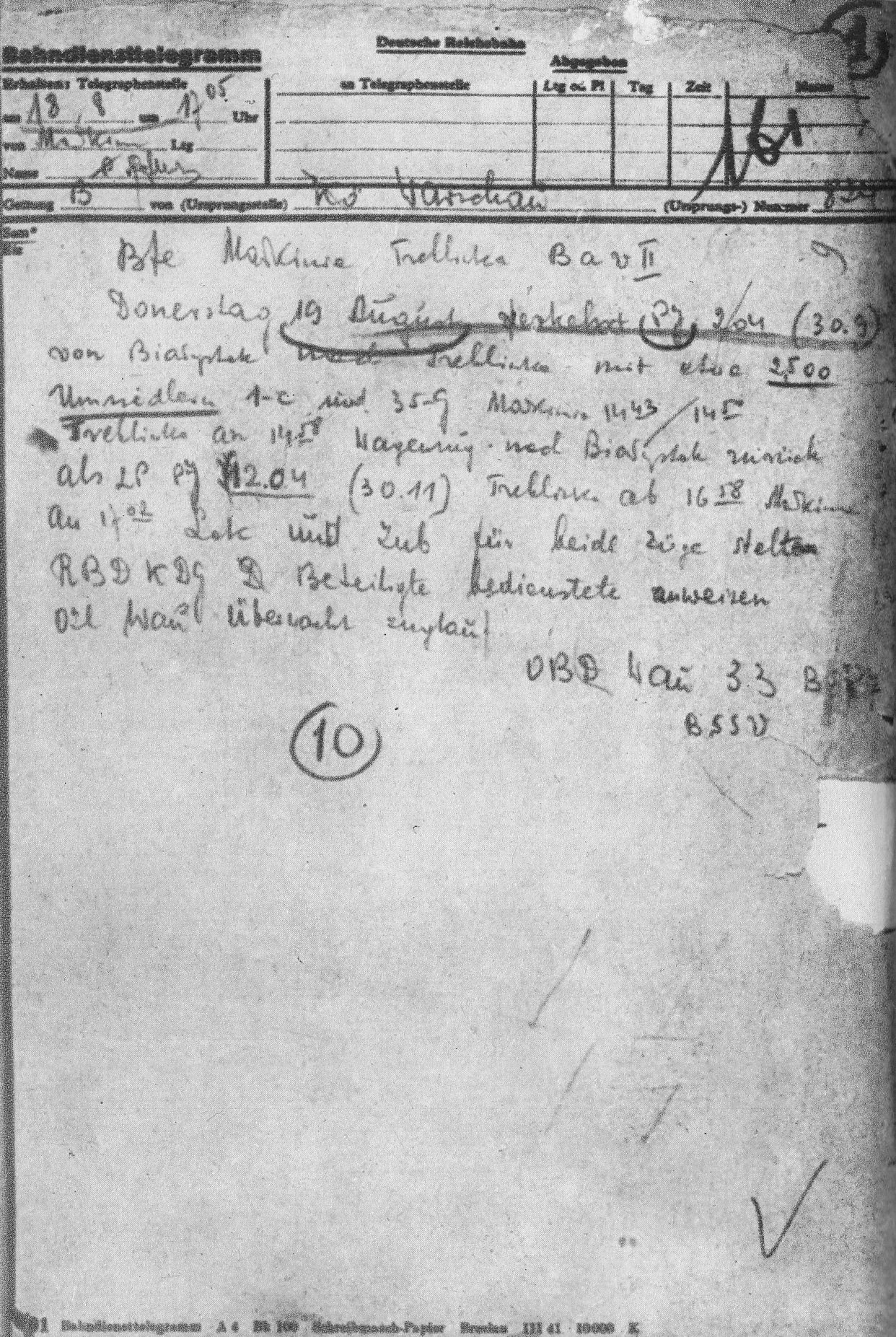
Deutsche Reichsbahn telegram about the last transport of 35 freight cars from Białystok to Treblinka death camp on August 18, 1943. It was the last departure before the camp closure.

On February 5–12, 1943, the first group of approximately 10,000 Białystok Jews were rounded up by the mobile battalions for the mass 'evacuation' of the ghetto. They were sent aboard Holocaust trains to their deaths at the Treblinka extermination camp. Another 2,000 victims, too weak or sick to run for the wagons were shot on the spot. Meanwhile, approximately 7,600 inmates were relocated into a new central transit camp within the city for further selection. Those fit to work were sent to the Majdanek camp. In Majdanek, after another screening for ability to work, they were transported to the Poniatowa concentration camp, Blizyn, as well as Auschwitz labor and extermination camp. Those deemed too emaciated to work were murdered in Majdanek gas chambers. More than 1,000 Jewish children were sent first to the Theresienstadt ghetto in Bohemia, and then to Auschwitz-Birkenau, where they were killed. Only a few months later, as part of Aktion Reinhard, on August 16, 1943, the ghetto was raided by regiments of the German SS with Ukrainian, Estonian, Latvian and Belarusian auxiliaries (Hiwis), known as Trawniki-men aiming at the ghetto's final destruction. Faced with the final deportations, when all hope for survival was abandoned, the Jewish underground staged the Białystok Ghetto Uprising. In the night of August 16, 1943, several hundred Polish Jews began an armed insurrection against the troops carrying out the liquidation of the ghetto.

Holocaust survivor and postwar historian Szymon Datner wrote: "The blockade of the ghetto lasted one full month and on September 15, 1943, after the last of the flames of resistance had been extinguished, the SS units retreated." The final stage of mass deportations commenced. Only a few dozen Jews managed to escape and join various partisan groups, including Soviet ones, in the Białystok area. The Red Army overran Białystok in August 1944.

During the ghetto's history, there were a number of Jewish escapes, as well as rescue attempts by local Polish gentiles. Righteous Among the Nations who helped Białystok Ghetto's Jews included the Skalski family, the Smolko family the Burda family the Czyżykowski family, and Jan Kaliszczuk. Not all rescue efforts were successful; Henryk Buszko was among those murdered by the Germans for his rescue efforts.

== Location and layout ==
The ghetto was located in the northwestern section of the historical center, roughly the vicinity of the current Sienkiewicza District and some of Przydworcowe District. It was bordered by Lipowa Street in the south, Sienkiewicza Street in the east and Poleska Street in the north. Following the heavy fighting in the Białystok Ghetto Uprising, and the fighting with the Soviet Armed Forces, most of the ghetto's original buildings were destroyed. Moreover, some of the streets totally disappeared and other streets' layout was changed. On the ruins of several streets (Smolna, Chmielna, Górna) a block of flats was built, the Sienkiewicza District.
