= Great Synagogue (Białystok) =

Destroyed synagogue in Białystok, Poland

- Polish: Wielka Synagoga w Białymstoku
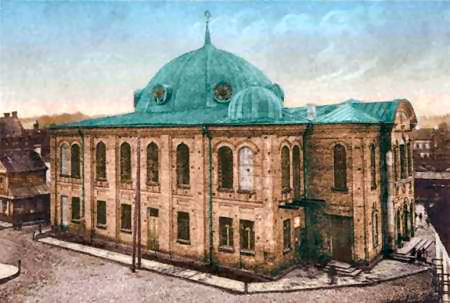
- A postcard image of the former synagogue, in 1920

- Location of the destroyed synagogue in Podlaskie Voivodeship

Religion
- Affiliation: Orthodox Judaism (former)
- Rite: Nusach Ashkenaz
- Ecclesiastical or organizational status: Synagogue (1913–1941)
- Status: Destroyed by arson

Location
- Location: Suraska Street, Białystok, Podlaskie Voivodeship
- Country: Poland
- Interactive map of Great Synagogue
- Coordinates: 53°07′50″N 23°09′26″E

Architecture
- Architect: Szlojme Rabinowicz
- Type: Synagogue architecture
- Style: Byzantine Revival
- Groundbreaking: 1909
- Completed: 1913
- Destroyed: June 27, 1941
- Dome: Three

The Great Synagogue (Polish: Wielka Synagoga w Białymstoku) was a former Orthodox Jewish congregation and synagogue, that was located in Białystok, in Podlaskie Voivodeship, Poland. The synagogue building was designed by Szlojme Rabinowicz and completed in 1913. The building served as a house of prayer until World War II when it was destroyed by Nazis on June 27, 1941. It was estimated that approximately 700 to 800 (Note: Estimates vary widely; some suggest the count could have reached as high as 2,500, while others estimate it much lower, around 500. The count of around 700 to 800 is likely closer to the actual figure. Among them were women with children.) Jewish people were inside the synagogue at the time of its destruction, by arson.

== History ==
The synagogue was located on Suraska Street. Construction began in 1909, and the building was completed in 1913. It was designed by Szlojme (Shlomo) Jakow Rabinowicz and included three Byzantine Revival-style domes: a large one with a 10 m-high (33 ft) spire over the main hall with two smaller ones flanking it over the side halls.

On the morning of June 27, 1941, Nazi troops from Police Battalion 309 of the Ordnungspolizei surrounded the town square by the Great Synagogue and forced residents from their homes into the street. Some were shoved up against building walls and shot dead. Others, some 700-800^{[see note a.]} men, women and children, were locked in the synagogue, which was then set on fire; there they burned to death. The Nazi onslaught continued with the grenading of numerous homes and further shootings. As the flames from the synagogue spread and merged with the grenade fires, the entire square was engulfed. On that day, some 3,000 Jews were killed.

== Monument ==
A reconstruction of the destroyed dome and a memorial plaque were dedicated in August 1995. The plaque reads: "Our splendid sanctuary fell victim to the flames on June 27, 1941. 2000 Jews were burnt alive in it by the German Nazi murderers."

== Gallery ==
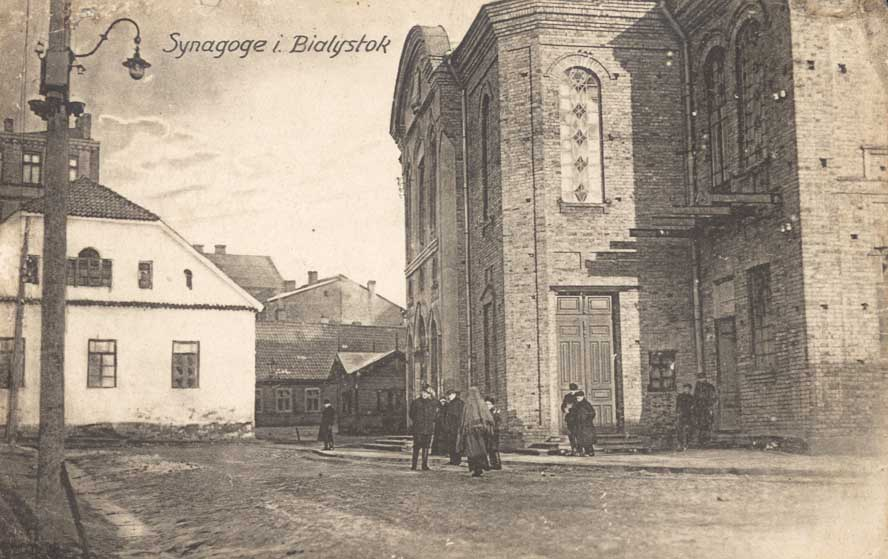
The Great Synagogue and Nomer Tamid

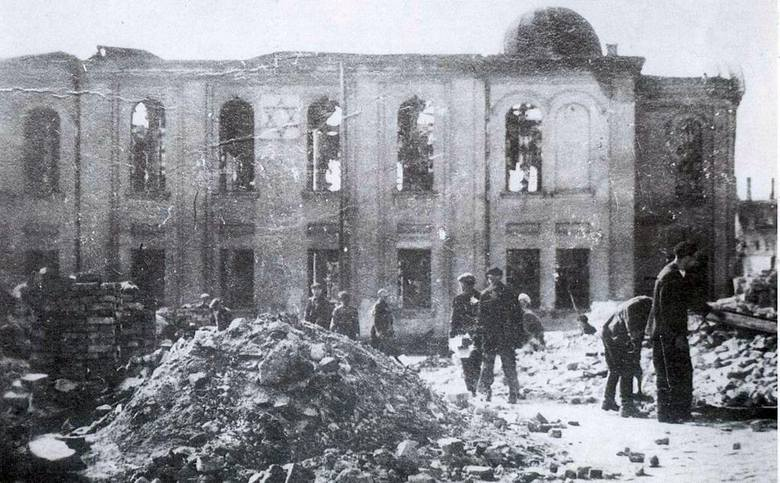
The synagogue ruins in 1941

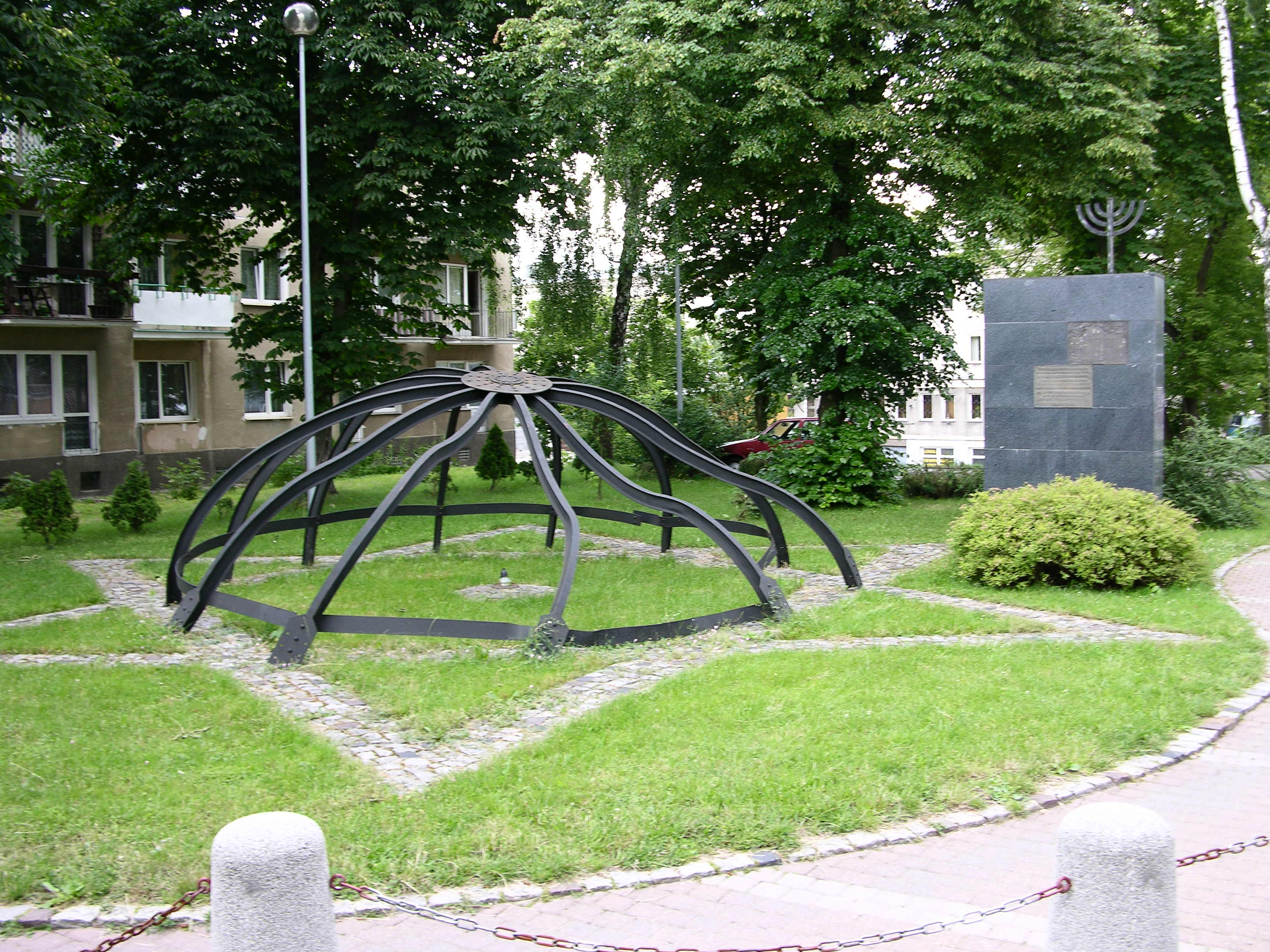
The memorial

== See also ==
- 1941 Białystok massacres
- History of the Jews in Białystok
- List of active synagogues in Poland
