= Jewish Heritage Trail in Białystok =

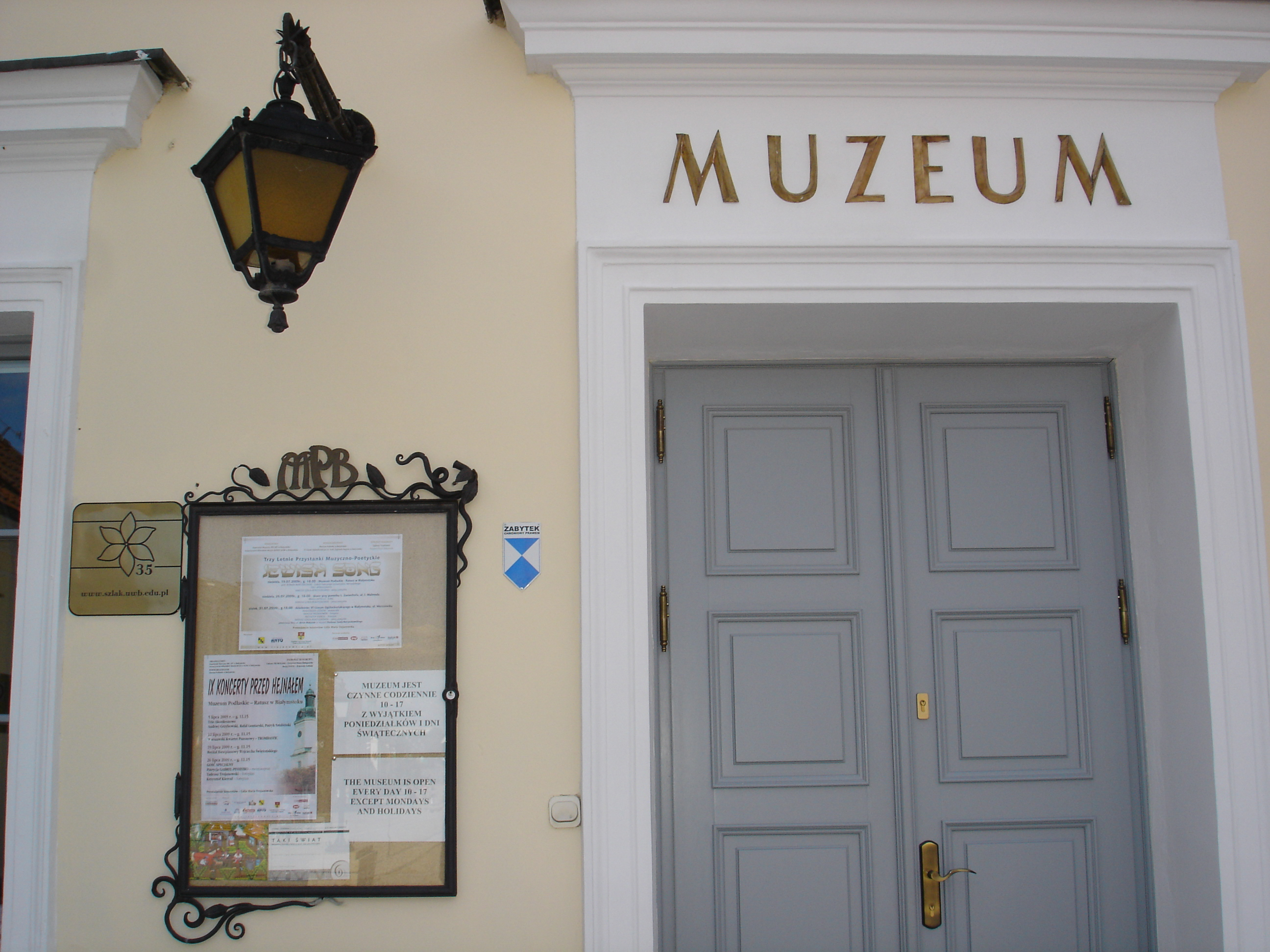
Logo of Jewish Heritage Trail in Białystok on the City Hall.

Jewish Heritage Trail in Białystok is a marked foot trail created in June 2008 in Białystok, Poland, by a group of students and doctorate candidates, who participate as volunteers at The University of Białystok Foundation.

One of the goals of the project was to generate social capital by engaging cooperation between local institutions and social groups. Project included: planning the trail, publicizing an informative booklet and map in printed and electronic version, building an interactive website of the project, marking the trail sites and opening the trail to the public with a walk around the city, publicizing teacher's materials.

== Trail sites ==
Trail logo

Cytron Palace (today's Historical Museum) – Tobacco Factory of Faiwel Janowski – Shmuel Synagogue – Jewish Female Gymnasium of Zinaida Chwoles – Białystok Palace Theatre – Jewish Hospital (now Maternity Hospital) – Białystok Trylling Palace – Zygmunt August Gymnasium (now Sigismund Augustus High School) – Sholem Aleichem Library – TOZ Sanatorium – The Hebrew Gymnasium (now Municipal Hospital) – Mansion (Sienkiewicza 26A) – Apollo Cinema – Mansion (ul. Sienkiewicza 26A; now State Theatre Academy) – Gymnasium of Jozef Zeligman, Jozef Lebenhaft and Jakub Dereczynski – Gilarino Miniature Theatre – Mansions of Isaac Zabludowski – Linas Chailim Charity Association – House of the Zamenhof Family – Monument to Ludwik Zamenhof – Yitzhak Malmed Plaque – Druskin Gymnasium – The Heroes of the Ghetto Uprising Monument – Cytron Synagogue (now Art Gallery of the Slendzinskis) – Warynskiego Street – The Modern Cinema – House of the Jakub Szapiro Family – Nowik Palace in Białystok – Tarbut (today Maria Grzegorzewska Craft School) – Jewish Craft School (now The Faculty of Physics at The University of Białystok) – The Barbican Mission (today's Syrena cinema) – Białystok-Chanajki Quarter – Piaski Quarter – Rabbinical Cemetery (today's Central Park in Białystok) – Piaskower Synagogue – The Monument of the Great Synagogue – The City Hall – The Jewish Cemetery (Wschodnia street) – and the Cholera cemetery in Białystok.

== People connected with Jewish heritage of Białystok ==
Białystok
- Coordinates: 53°07′N 23°09′E
- Website: http://szlak.uwb.edu.pl

During the trail planning, organizers chose personages significant in the city's history city history: artists, activists, politicians, scientists and Righteous among the Nations.

- Zygmunt Białostocki – composer, pianist
- Zygmunt Bobowski – painter, member of the artists' group Czapka Frygijska
- Wiktor Bubryk – dramatic director, manager of theatre of miniatures "Gilarino"
- Roza Bursztejn (Rosa Raisa) – operatic singer
- Izaak Celnikier – painter
- Józef Chazanowicz – doctor, Zionist activist, founder of National Library of Israel
- Molli Chwat – painter
- Zinaida Chwolesowa – foundress of female high school
- Szmuel Cytron – the manufacturer, founder of synagogue, original owner of palace near Warszawska 37
- Szymon Datner – historian
- Dawid Druskin – the founder of high school
- Michał Duniec – painter, member of the bialystokers artists' group Forma-Farba-Faktura
- Osip Dymow – dramatist
- Nachum Edelman – painter, member of the bialystokers artists' group Forma-Farba-Faktura
- Leo Fink – the manufacturer, activist of Jewish organizations in Australia
- Ester Gessen – the journalist, translator, author of the memoirs "Drogi, ktorych nie wybieramy"
- Chajka Grossman – fighter of the Białystok ghetto, Israeli politician
- Natan Gutman – painter
- Zbigniew Antoni Huzarski – Righteous among the Nations
- Fajwel Janowski – manufacturer
- Kalmen Kaplansky – politician, human rights activist
- Boris Kaufman – movie operator, documentarian, Oscar laureate
- David Kaufman aka Dziga Vertov -- pioneering Soviet documentary filmmaker and film theorist
- Józef Kerszman – ophthalmologist, social worker
- Gustaw Kerszman – microbiologist, geneticist
- Chaim Jakub Lipszyc – sculptor, painter
- Maxim Litvinov – Soviet diplomat
- Juliusz Krajewski – painter, member of the artists' group Czapka Frygijska
- Helena Malarewicz-Krajewska – painter, one of the first representatives of socialist realism
- Icchok Malmed – a hero of Białystok ghetto
- Zajnwel Messner – sculptor
- Hersz Mersik – creator of Białystok ghetto archive
- Szmuel Mohylewer – rabbi, founder of school and credit company
- Sonia Najman (Nora Ney) – actress
- Chaim Nowik – manufacturer, original owner of palace near Lipowa Street 35
- Felicja Raszkin-Nowak – writer, survivor of the Białystok Ghetto
- Bencjon Rabinowicz – painter
- Oskar Rozanecki – painter
- Albert Bruce Sabin – inventor of an oral polio vaccine
- Czesław Sadowski – painter, member of the Białystok artists' group Forma-Farba-Faktura
- Simon Segal – painter, graphic artist, designer of fabrics
- Menasze i Efraim Seidenbeutel – painters
- Hayyim Selig Slonimski – astronomer, inventor, grandfather of writer Antoni Słonimski
- Yitzhak Shamir – Prime Minister of Israel
- Jakub Szapiro – journalist, popularizer of Esperanto, founder of Ludwik Zamenhofs Association of Esperantists in Białystok
- Mordechaj Tenenbaum – leader of Białystok Ghetto Uprising
- Helena i Chaim Tryllingowie – the manufacturers, original owners of palace near Warszawska 7
- Ichiel Tynowicki – painter, member of the Białystok artists' group Forma-Farba-Faktura
- Max Weber – painter
- Izaak Zabłudowski – tradesman, philanthropist
- Ludwik Zamenhof – inventor of Esperanto
- Józef Zeligman – founder of multicultural high school
- Nahum Zemach – the organizer of Habima Theatre, which had become the Jewish National Theater in Tel Aviv
- Henryk Złotkowski – Righteous Among the Nations
