= Knyszyn Forest =

Forest in Podlaskie Voivodeship, Poland

- Polish: Puszcza Knyszyńska
- IUCN category II (national park)
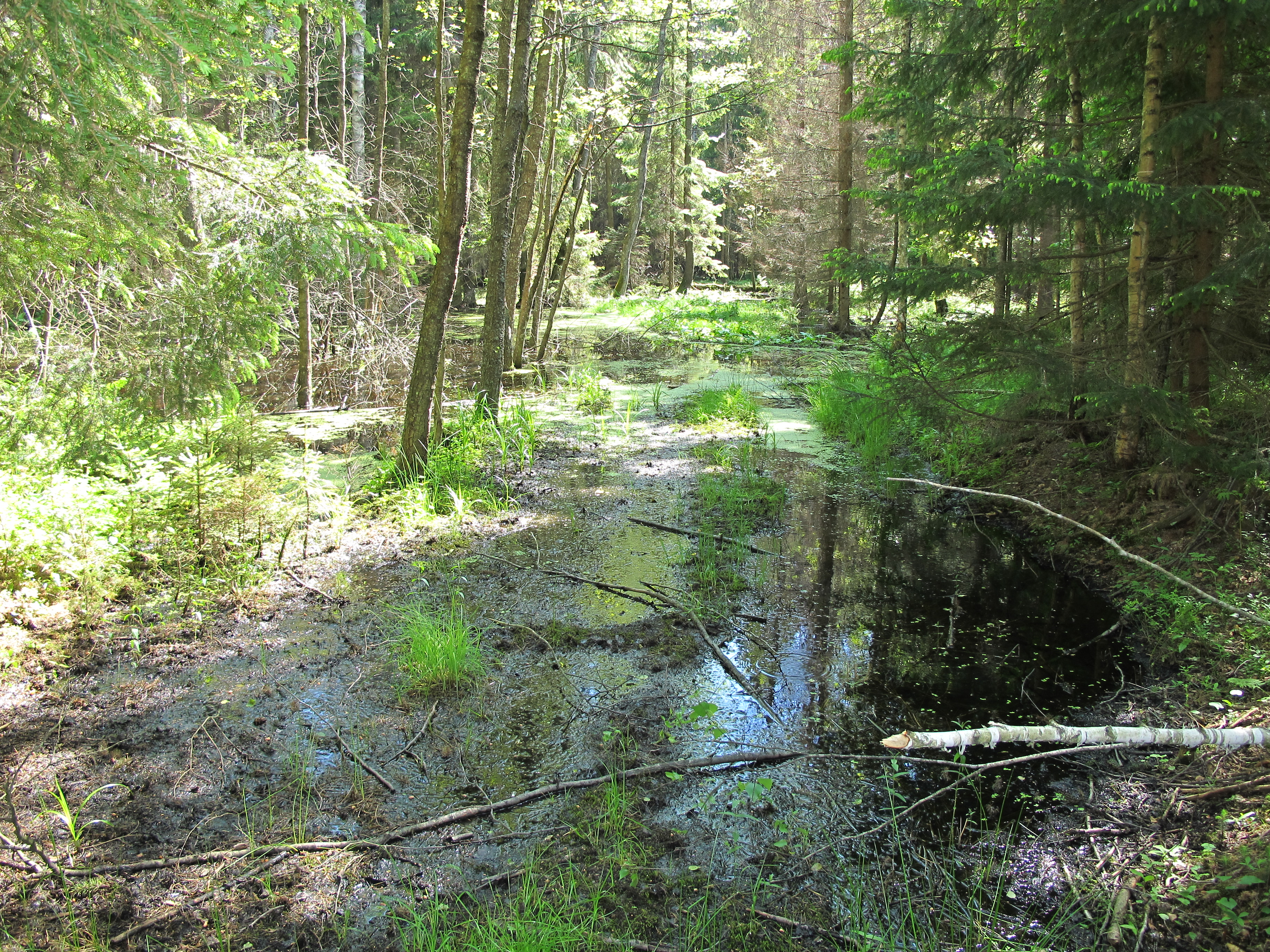
- Knyszyńska Forest, June 2011

- Location within Poland
- Location: Podlaskie Voivodeship, Poland
- Nearest city: Białystok
- Coordinates: 53°12′50″N 23°26′12″E
- Area: 1,050 km^{2} (410 sq mi)
Designations

Knyszyn Forest (Polish: Puszcza Knyszyńska, Puszcza Knyszyńsko-Białostocka) is a vast forest complex (second in size after the Białowieska Forest in the Podlasie Lowland) (Polish: Nizina Podlaska) located in the Białystok Upland in the Podlaskie Voivodeship. The forests cover there areas of the frontal moraine, and the Supraśl River flows along the tributary of Sokołda. Supraśl is the seat of the Knyszyńska Forest Landscape Park.

The area of the Forest is about 1050 km^{2}, but as a result of afforestation of former agricultural land, its area increases every year. This process is particularly visible in the eastern part of its area.

The forest is dominated by pine, spruce, and birch, alder and oak. There are bison refuges in the Knyszyńska Forest (since 1974). In the Knyszyńska Forest in 1988, the Knyszyn Forest Landscape Park was created.

== Human settlement and development ==
From the entire area of the Knyszyńska Forest, the oldest remains of human settlement come from 10,000 years ago, from the pre-boreal and boreal periods of the Holocene period. At that time, tundra-type vegetation with an admixture of birch and later encroaching pine predominated. Larger human groups appeared in these areas due to the reindeer herd migration. The Narew and Biebrza valleys were natural routes for their animals for their seasonal migrations. They were a valuable source of food and other materials for contemporary people (e.g. skins for sewing clothes, building huts).

Along with the progressing global warming, there were changes in the vegetation (taiga forest appears) and in the fauna. In the Supraśl valley, archaeologists discovered places related to settlement from the end of the Boreal period, i.e. about 6000 years ago. It was a heavily forested area, attractive to man for hunting elk and deer as well as for fishing. From this period comes the tomb of a hunter from Konne, discovered just before World War II. He was an example of a burial, which is rare in the Polish territories, where the deceased was planted tied in a grave and sprinkled with red dye (ocher). This type of burial occurred in the Mesolithic, in the eastern regions of Europe.

Due to global warming, agriculture and farming began to spread. Due to the low soil fertility, animal husbandry was more popular among the forest population. The first breeders in this area appeared around 4,000 years ago. At the same time, natural resources of the surrounding forests and rivers were intensively exploited. Various tools have been preserved from these times, i.e. stone axes (in Zapiecke and in Krzemienne), tools for working with skins (Zasady and Surażkowo) and smoothed flint ax (found in Pieszczaniki).

In the Bronze Age, tribes living in the Knyszyńska Primeval Forest began to exploit flint deposits, whose resources were discovered around the village of Rybniki. The mine sculpture in the form of funnels over buried windows and heaps has been well preserved. This allowed to examine and isolate various ways of obtaining raw material by contemporary people. Flint mining was carried out by digging deep pits (so-called pit mines) or by cutting into a steep slope of a hill and extracting lumps of raw material from it. Its first treatment took place in so-called near-workshop workshops, while for further processing, the raw material traveled to the vicinity of the Krzemianka River, where mining camps were often established. The final process of finishing flint semi-finished products took place there.

== Surface waters ==
Backwaters around Szudziaów The surface waters of the Knyszyńska Forest are an important element of the forest landscape and are characterized by very high hydrographic conciseness, as nearly 95% of the Park area lies in the basin of Supraśl river. It is mainly a lattice network of rivers, very different riverbed falls (some of them with a fall of more than 3 ‰ typical for foothills rivers). The main river of the Park - Supraśl is fed by rivers of varying length from 3 km (Jałówka near Supraśl) to over 30 km (Sokołda, Czarna). The original surface water network is supplemented by a system of artificial canals and drainage ditches, as well as several ponds and dam reservoirs.

Important from the point of view of water resource management is the long-term dynamics of river flows, which is measured by the coefficient of variation. Among the forest rivers, Czarna and Słoja have the least variable average monthly flows, and the largest Sokołda and upper Supraśl in Zauki.

== Flora ==
According to the geobotanical division of Poland led by Władysław Szafer, the Knyszyńska Primeval Forest belongs to the Bialowieza-Knyszyn Northern Department. It is the only area in Central Europe close in many respects (structural, geobotanical or zoogeographic) to the southwestern taiga. The varied terrain and the associated significant microclimatic, hydrological and soil differences, occurring even in small areas, contribute to the formation of a large number of plant communities. The plant world is characterized by the occurrence of subboreal communities and a significant share of boreal species with the dominance of spruce in forest complexes. There are 23 forest and shrub complexes were found in the Knyszyńska Forest. The most common are: coniferous forest Carici digitatae-Piceetum, multi-species mixed coniferous forest Serratulo-Piceetum, fresh pine forest Peucedano-Pinetum.

== See also ==
- Białowieża Forest
- Augustów Primeval Forest

== Bibliography ==
- Kołos Aleksander: Park Krajobrazowy Puszczy Knyszyńskiej, w: „Przyroda Polska” nr 5 (389), maj 1989 r., s. 10-12;
- Puszcza Knyszyńska, monografia przyrodnicza pod redakcją Andrzeja Czerwińskiego, Zespół Parków Krajobrazowych w Supraślu, Supraśl 1995.
