= Branickiego Street, Białystok =

Street in Poland

Branickiego Street
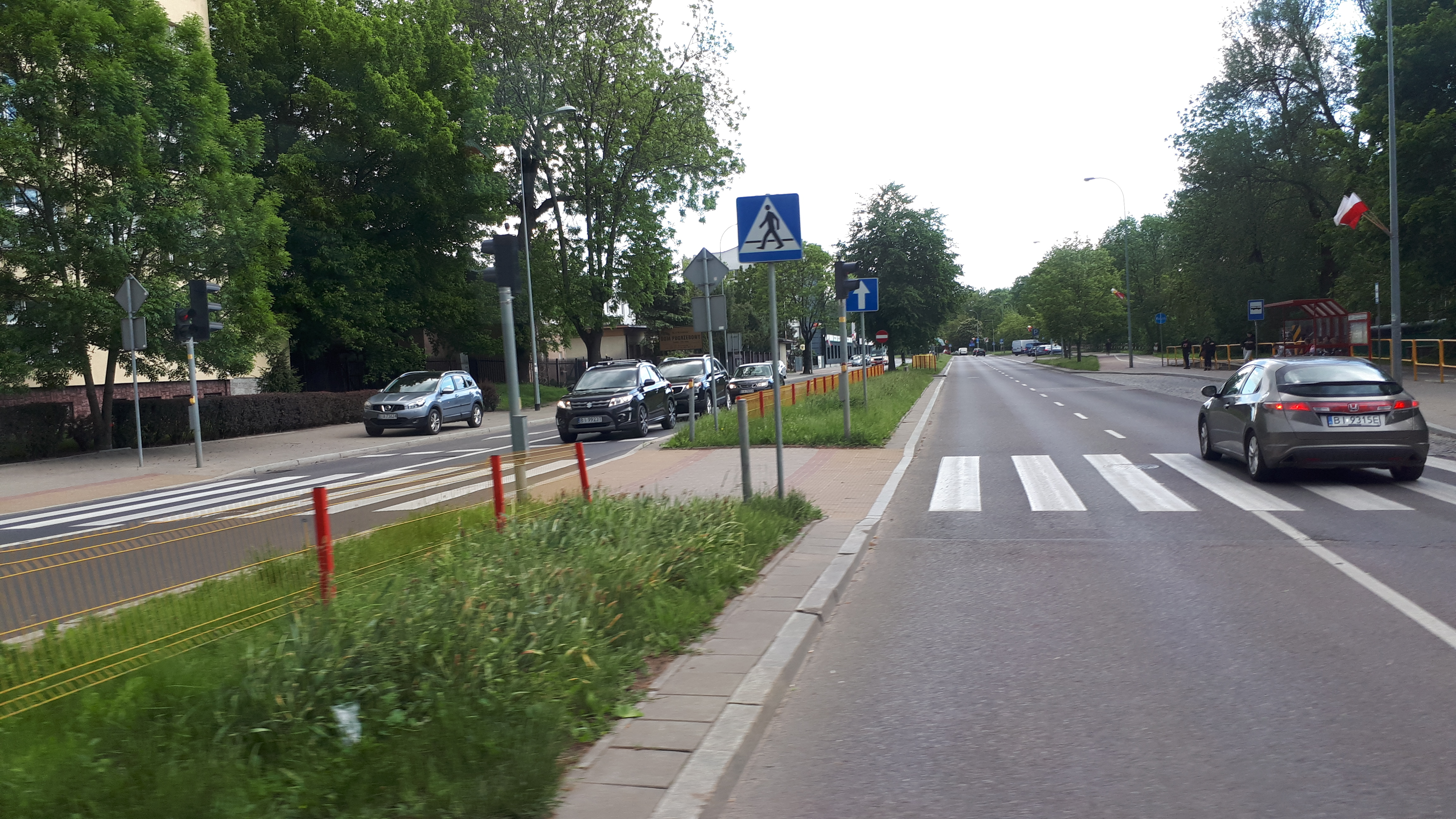
- Native name: Ulica Branickiego (Polish)
- Former name(s): Bulwarna, Lenina,
- Type: Street
- Length: 2.6 km (8,500 ft)
- Location: Centrum District, Białystok
- Coordinates: 53°07′32″N 23°10′52″E

Branickiego Street (Polish: Ulica Jana Klemensa Branickiego) is a street and a thoroughfare in Białystok passing through Centrum, Bojary, Mickiewicza, Piasta II and Skorupy districts of the city.

== History ==
This street was marked out in the 18th century. At that time, it had no name and was rather a walking alley leading along the "great pond". It was an important element of the spatial composition surrounding the Branicki Palace and occupied the area between Pałacowa and Świętojańska Streets. In 1895, work began on filling the marshland of the neglected and drying pond. In its western part, the City Park was established, along the edge of which, just beyond the Biała river bed, Bulwarna Street was marked out. The park was separated from the street by a high, stylish fence, built of stone blocks and filled with decorative gratings. The entrance to the park was guarded by massive, steel gates. One of them was situated on the corner of Bulwarna (Branickiego) and Mieszczanska (Elektryczna) Streets. In 1940, following the inclusion of Białystok in the newly annexed Western Belorussia, the Soviet authorities changed the name of the street to Shchorsa - a participant in the October Revolution. In 1941, the Germans named it Goethe. In the years 1949–1990, it was named Lenina. Following the end of Communism and the demise of the Polish People's Republic the street name was reverted to Branickiego. In 1981, the street section was extended from Świętojańska Street to the intersection with Ciołkowskiego Street to accommodate transit traffic running through Nowowarszawska Street.
