= Świętojańska Street, Białystok =

Street in Białystok, Poland

Świętojańska Street
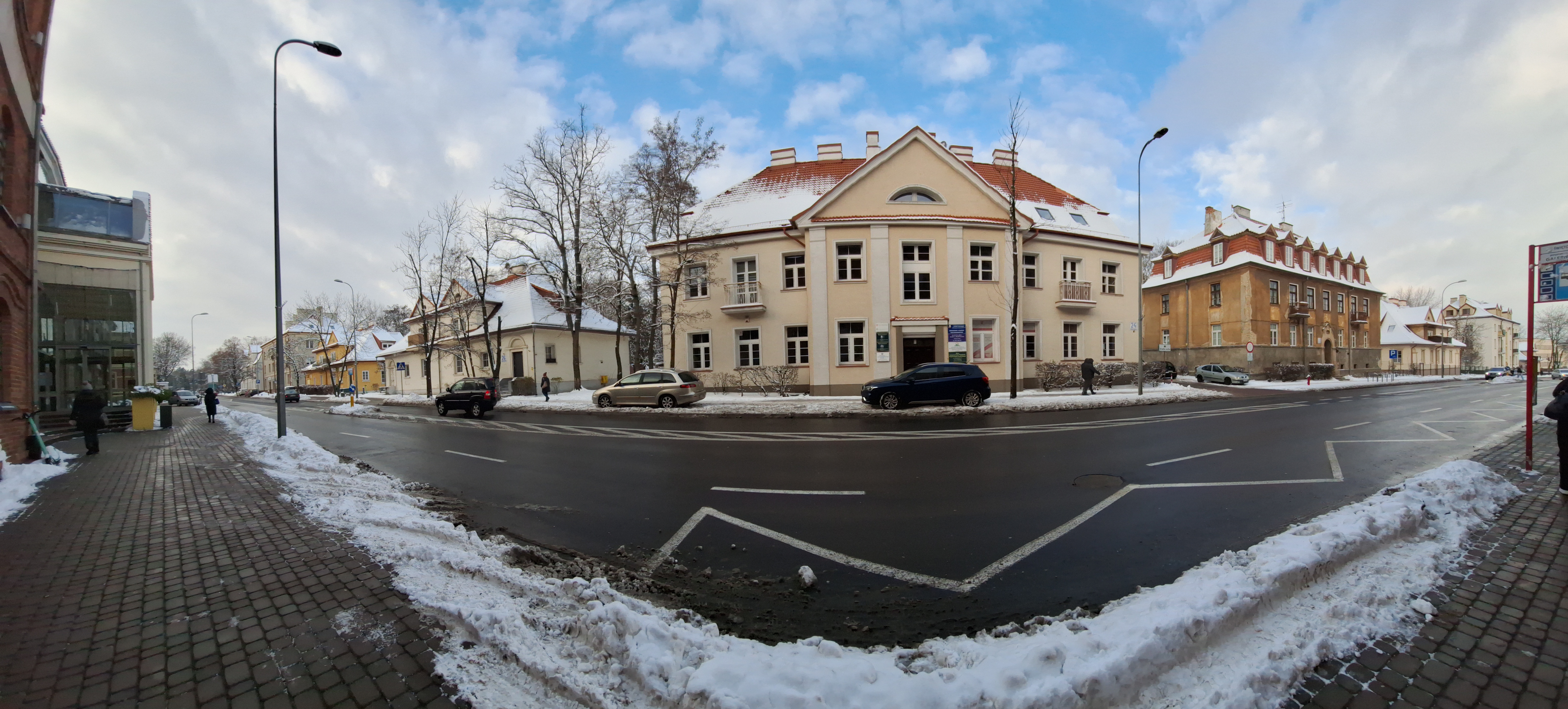
- Interactive map of Świętojańska Street
- Native name: Ulica Świętojańska (Polish)
- Type: Street
- Length: 960 m (3,150 ft)
- Location: Centrum District, Białystok
- Coordinates: 53°07′38″N 23°10′16″E

Świętojańska Street (Polish: Ulica Świętojańska) is a street located in the Centrum, Mickiewicza and Bojary districts of Bialystok. It runs from Katyński Square, through Mickiewicza and Branickiego Streets, to Warszawska Street.

== History ==
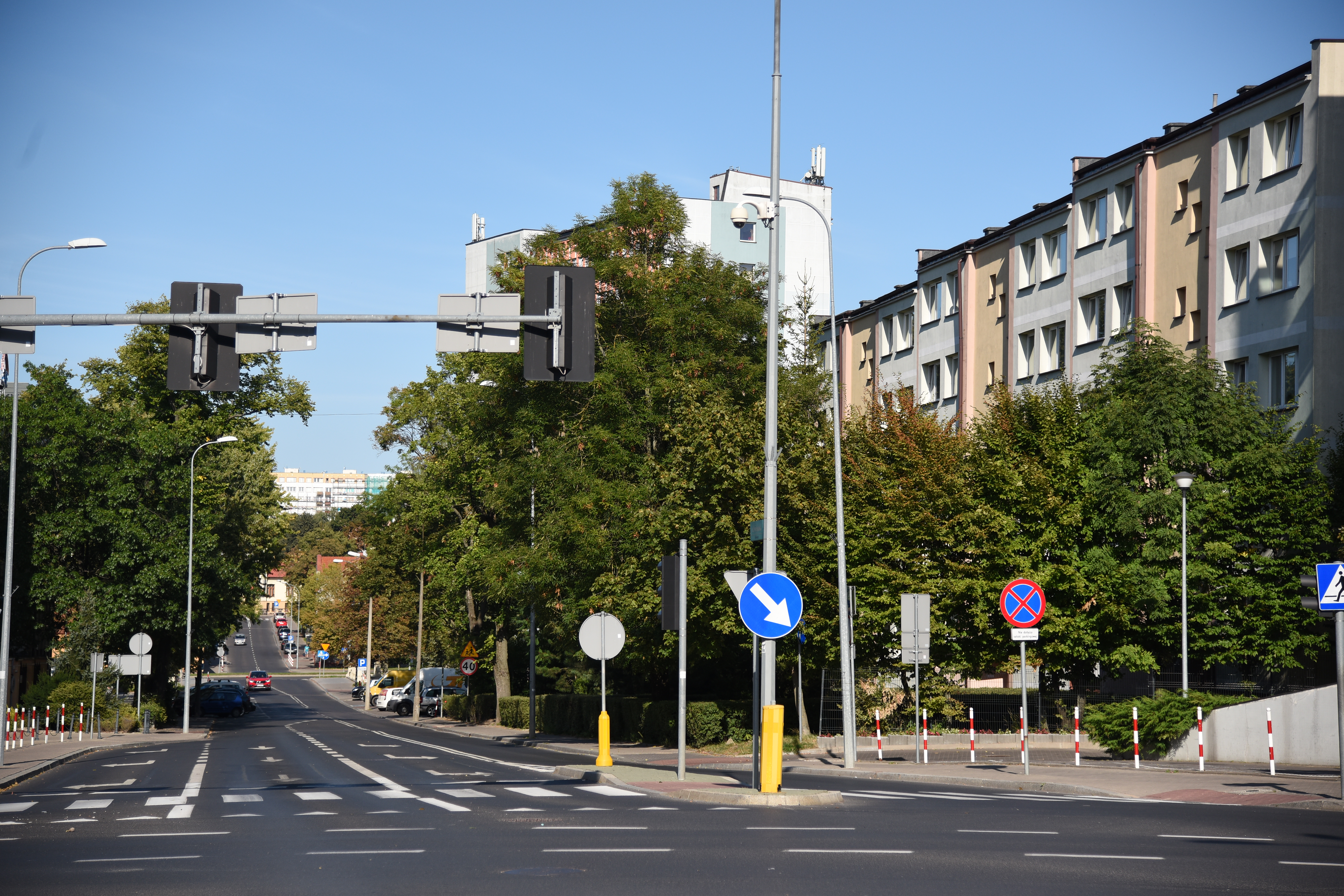
View of the street

Świętojańska Street was laid out in the mid-18th century. Its name comes from the statue of Saint John of Nepomuk, which stood by the bridge over the Biała river. This street, or rather a road, along which there were no buildings, was lined with a row of linden and aspen trees. It connected Nowe Miasto (Warszawska) with the Solnica route leading towards Zabłudów (currently Mickiewicza Street), and then through Wojszki and Granne to Warsaw. Its perspective from the side of Nowe Miasto was closed by a chapel with the passion of the Lord Jesus, built in the 18th century. In the 19th century, the name Prudska (from the Russian word prud which stands for pond) was used to designate this street. In the second half of that century, textile factories began to be established near the river. At the turn of the 20th century, on the section between Warszawska and Mickiewicza streets, there were factories of Polak, Ram, Filipp, Suraski, Aleksander Kronenberg, Mordechaj Głaz, Jankiel Kotlar, Izaak Liwerant, Szymon Okoń, Szloma Słucki, Kalaman Winiar, Ajyzk Zilberberg and Samuel Pines. In the upper part of the street, leading to Zwierzyniec at the exit of Podleśna Street (then Zwierzynicka), there was a horse tram depot. In the interwar period, the character of this street changed with the construction of houses for the civil servants' colony and the establishment of nearby plantations. In 1940, the Soviet authorities changed the name of the street to Komintern. In 1942, the Germans called it Kantstrasse. In the years 1949–1990, it was called Marcelego Nowotki.

=== Notable buildings ===
- 15 Świętojańska - Becker's Factory. Today used as a shopping mall.
- 17 Świętojańska - Alfons Karny Museum of Sculpture.
