= Daniel Moszkowicz =

- Born: 1905
- Died: 1943 (aged 37–38)
- Conflicts: Second World War

Daniel Moszkowicz aka "Dawid Chone" and "Jerzy" (born 1905 in Warsaw - 1943 in Białystok, Poland) was a merchant, non-commissioned reserve officer of the Polish Army, communist and the co-leader of the Białystok Ghetto Uprising.

He was member of the Communist Party of Poland. During the German occupation of Poland he worked as a cobbler and baker in the ghetto of Białystok and was member of the Antyfaszystowska Organizacja Bojowa. (Anti-Fascist Military Organization). He was co-leader of the resistance during the first German attempt of liquidation of the ghetto in Białystok in January and February 1943. He was also a co-leader of the Białystok Ghetto Uprising in August 1943.

Moszkowicz is believed to have committed suicide surrounded by German troops.

== See also ==
- Mordechaj Tenenbaum

== Awards ==
- Order of the Cross of Grunwald (III Class)
