= Street names in Białystok =

The names of the streets in Białystok, capital of Podlaskie Voivodeship in north-east Poland are result of historical, political, geographical and symbolical reasons. Throughout its history, the city was ruled by different countries and political regimes which led to various streets to be renamed more than once. Streets in Białystok, as elsewhere in Poland can be categorized by different topics, such as streets named after persons, historical events, geographical places and symbolic names.

== Overview ==
The main arteries in Białystok are often named after important persons and historical events. Some of the persons are connected with national events while others closely related with local history. Examples of streets named after persons and events at the national level include:

- Piłsudskiego - Polish politician, founder of the Second Polish Republic
- Mickiewicza - Polish revolutionary
- Sienkiewicza - Polish revolutionary
- 11 Listopada - the date marking the National Independence Day of Poland
- Marii-Sklodowskiej - Polish scientist
- Wyszynskiego - Polish cardinal
- Legionowa - commemorating the Polish Legions in World War I
- Jana Pawła II - Polish Pope of the Roman Catholic Church

Other streets are named after persons connected to the local history and events:

- Branickiego - named after Jan Klemens Branicki, a local ruler
- Elektryczna - named after the first powerplant in Białystok which was situated in the crossroad of Elektryczna and Branickiego streets.
- Kaczorowskiego - named after president Ryszard Kaczorowski who was spending his childhood in Piaski District of the city.
- Liniarskiego - named after Władysław Liniarski who fought in the Home Army in Białystok area
- Marjańskiego - named after Józef Marjański who fought in the 1920 Battle of Białystok.
- Malmeda - named after Icchok Malmed who was prisoned in the Białystok Ghetto and killed German officers.
- Sosnowskiego - named after architect Oskar Sosnowski who planned among others Św. Rocha Church.
- Szafranowskiego - named after Zygmunt Szafranowski Polish officer who helped organizing the defense of the city in the onset of World War II.
- Zamenhofa - named after L. L. Zamenhof who created esperanto and was born at this street.
- Plac Zbigniew Baum - named after a city hall official and architect who was behind the plan to extend Bialowny street (Mazowieckiego street).
- Skwer Chajki Grossman - named after Haika Grossman, a prisoner of Białystok Ghetto and one of the leading participants of the Białystok Ghetto uprising.

Some streets preserve in their name their original purpose, as a road leading to other places:

- Suraska - remnant of the ancient way which led to Suraż.
- Wasiłkowska - named after the road leading to Wasilków.
- Pałacowa - the road which led to Branicki Palace.
- Towarowa - due to the street running in parallel to the Białystok Fabryczny Train Station, which was used to transport freight.
- Skrajna - the old road to Wysoki Stoczek passed there, and the name preserved in that street, together with its extension, Lniana street.

In other districts of Białystok there are cases neighbouring streets which bear names of related topics, for example streets with names related to flowers in Dziesięciny I District or names related to stars and cosmos in Bacieczki District.

In some cases there is a conflict between opposite political camps regarding the naming of a street. An example of such a case occurred when in 2018 the Białystok City Council, at the initiative of Law and Justice councillors, which held a majority then, named an unnamed road Łupaszki street. Following the local election held that year Civic Platform coalition gained a majority at the city council and promoted initiative to rename the street, claiming that Zygmunt Łupaszko was a controversial figure accused in nationalist crimes during World War II. After objection from some of the coalition members and protests of local residents, the initiative was discontinued and instead the extension of that street called 'Podlaska' street which itself turned to be controversial move among Law and Justice members. While the city hall claimed other streets in the area are named after various geographical regions and so this is natural name, the opposition led by Law and Justice members in the city council claimed that this is not natural as there is no connection between Łupaszko which is a person, and Podlaska which is a geographical and administrative region in Poland.

In the decades after the war, as part of the massive re-construction and development efforts which followed the mass destruction, large number of pre-war streets were erased from the map during the demolishing and construction and widening of new streets. Such names include them are Siedlecka, Cicha, Orlańska, Piesza, Szlachecka, Mińska, Syjońska, Palestyńska, Jasna, Kacza, Kosynierska, Różańska, Chmielna, Chmielna, Górna, Smolna, Łódzka, Niecala, Smutna, Rabińska, Chazanowicza, Tykocińska, Jastrzębia, Dobrzyniewska, Alta, Sportowa, Koszarowa, Zamkowa, Fastowska, Ciemna, Widna, Głucha, Zalewna, Mokra, Gęsia, Bożnicza, Opatowska, Bażantarska, Pokorna Szkolna, Ceglana, Ordynarska, Stolarska, Czackiego, Alejowa, Skidelska, Indurska, Sienna, Berdyczowska, Wołkowyska, Książęca, Wronia, Okrągła, Grzybowa, Okopowa, Wisniowa and Mazurska.

== History ==
The earliest known street names are those which appear in the 1799 city plan:

Name in 1799	Name today
Bojarska	Warszawska (from Sienkiewicza to Pałacowa)
Choroska	Lipowa
Kleiforf	Elektryczna (from Biała river to Warszawska)
Nowa	Spółdzielcza
Nowe Miasto	Warszawska (from Pałacowa to Elektryczna)
Podrzeczna (first)	nad Białką (from Pałacowa to Kościelna)
Podrzeczna (second)	Nad Białką (from Kościelna to Sienkiewicza)
Przedmieście Wasilkowskie	Sienkiewicza (to Biała river)
Suraska	Suraska
Świętojańska	Świętojańska
Wasilkowska	Sienkiewicza (from Rynek Kościuszki to Biała river)
Zagumienna	Malmeda (to 1946 Kupiecka)
Zamkowa	Pałacowa
Zatylna Północna	Białówny
Zatylna	-
Zatylna Poprzeczna	(after 1807 Cerkiewna, then Kryńska and after 1919 Kacza)
Zatylna (Podłużna) First	-
Zatylna (Podłużna) Second	-
Zatylna (Podłużna) Third	-
Zatylna Zachodnia	-
Zielona	Zamenhofa
Browarna	-
Jatkowa	-
Niemiecka	Kilińskiego
Pocztowa	-

=== Russian Empire (1815-1915) ===
Following the Partition of Poland and the 1807 Treaties of Tilsit, Białystok became part of the Russian Empire and with the time it had passed through a Russification process as part of which the many street were renamed to honour Russian culture and national identity. As such, Sienkiewicza Street was renamed Nicholas street after Emperor Nicholas I of Russia.

=== Second Polish Republic (1919-1939) ===
Following the regaining of independence and the establishment of the Second Polish Republic in the aftermath of First World War, the new municipal authorities began with massive renaming of streets, aiming at polonization and promoting the Polish statehood, history and national identity. In some cases the streets names were kept as they were, in others a completely new name was given and in other cases the names were simply translated from the Russian name to a same meaning name in Polish. As late as July 1919, Russian information signs were still hanging on the doors of the city hall building. One of the councilors proposed naming one of the streets "14 Lipca". This was met with Puchalski's retort that in such a case a street would have to be created on July 14th to commemorate the celebration of the American holiday. After further debates, a compromise was reached, which consisted in renaming Sadowa Street to Wersalska (now Akademicka) and Łozowa Street to Waszyngtona. In January 1925 mayor Szymański's proposal to name one of the streets "19 Lutego", requested that a section of Kolejowa Street, from the railway viaduct to Lipowa Street which would commemorate the entry of Polish troops into Białystok, had also not passed, with councilors decided to rename instead the section of Kolejowa Street to Gen. Jan Henryk Dąbrowski.

Among the old and new streets:

Old name	New name
Bulwarna	Branickiego
Kucharski zaułek	Angielska
Michajłowska	Daleka
Charkowska	Gdańska
Czarny zaułek	Czarna
Stołbowa	Filarowa
Mieszczańska	Elektryczna
Ossorgińska	Giełdowa
Kniżna	Gęsia
Kaflowa	Grunwaldzka
Oranżeryjna	Inspektowa
Pocztowa	Jurowiecka
Niemiecka	Kilińskiego
Nowoniemiecka	Legionowa
Sołdacka	Legionowa
Dwinska	Łomżyńska
Intendantski zaułek	Magazynowa
Iwanowski zaułek	Majowa
Mramorna	Marmurowa
Brzeska	Mickiewicza
Puszkinska	Mickiewicza
Bannaja	Mokra
Kościelny zaułek	Niecała
Instytutowa	Pałacowa
Gogolewska	Słonimska
Staroszosowa	Świętego Rocha
Aleksandrowska	Warszawska
Jewrejska	Żydowska
Targ na Piaskach	Sienny rynek
Bazarny Plac	Rynek Kościuszki
Moesowska	Krakowska
Nowoszosowa	Kolejowa

In addition, during the existence of the Second Polish Republic, further renaming of major streets were made:

- In January 1925 section of Kolejowa street was renamed Dąbrowskiego.
- In 1930 Mostowa street changed to Dr. Chazanowicza.
- In March 1931 Lipowa street renamed to Piłsudskiego (not to confuse with the current Piłsudskiego Avenue which didn't exist then).
- In 1932 Pałacowa street renamed Żwirki i Wigury (reverted after the war).
- In 1934 Warszawska street renamed Pierackiego (reverted after the war).
- In 1936 Elektryczna street renamed Orlicz-Dreszera (reverted after the war).

=== Soviet occupation (1939-1941) ===
Following the Invasion of the Soviet Union to Poland, Białystok was annexed to the Byelorussian Soviet Socialist Republic (BSSR) and a massive Sovietization policies implemented. As such, many streets were renamed to promote Soviet and Communist ideology and narrative. On the 8th of January 1940 the Soviet-controlled city hall (called in Polish Miejski Komitet Wykonawczy w Białymstoku) published the list of street renaming, (officially in according with demands of the working people following the Conference of the Union of the Textile, Food and Construction Industry and the Meeting of Representatives of Workers' Councils). Among the changes:

Old name	New name
Piłsudskiego	Sowiecka
Rynek Kościuszki	Sowiecka
Kilińskiego	Sowiecka
Sienkiewicza	Lenina
Wasilkowska	Lenina
Dąbrowskiego	Czapajewa
Nowy Świat	Swierdłowa
Sobieskiego	Marksa
Jurowiecka	Pocztowa
Piasta	Gorkiego
Żwirki i Wigury	Czkałowa
Branickiego	Szczorsa
Giełdowa	Leningradzka
Kościelna	Tołstoja
Jagiellońska	8 Marca
Park 3 Maja	17 Września
Aleja 11 Listopada	17 Września
Legionowa	Lotnicza
Rabińska	Majakowskiego
Harcerska	Sportowa
Jerozolimska	Czerwonej Gwiazdy
Bożnicza	Papanińska
Św. Rocha	Październikowa
Palestyńska	Luksemburga
Szlachecka	Kołchoźnicza
Świętojańska	Kominternu
Hetmańska	Libknechta
Nowy Świat	Swierdłowa
Poznańskiej	Dzierżyńskiego
Słonimska	Kirowa
Stołeczna	Czajkowskiego
Świętokrzyska	Stalskiego
Ułańska	Ulianowa
Wersalska	Moskiewska
Bema	Komsomolska
Częstochowska	Rewolucyjna
Grunwaldzka	Urickiego
Waszyngtona	Engelska

=== German occupation (1941-1944) ===
In June 1941 the German Army entered Białystok as part of Nazi Germany's war on the Soviet Union. The renaming of streets could be seen in a city plan from 1942 issued by the German authorities. Among those changes of street names, can be noted:

Old name	New name
Aleja 11 Listopada	Richthofen Strasse
Angielska	Badenweiler
Antoniukowska	Nadrauen
Antoniuk Fabryczny	Nadrauen
Armatnia	Kanonen
Artyleryjska	Artillerie
Bema	Barbara
Biała	Mars
Białostoczańska	Kamerun
Botaniczna	Tapiauer
Branickiego	Goethe
Brukowa	Standarten
Czarna	Schwarze Casse
Częstochowska	Leipziger
Dąbrowskiego	Königsberger
Elektryczna	Kleindorf
Hetmańska	Insterburger
Jurowiecka	Post
Kilińskiego	Deutche
Kolejowa	Königzberger
Kupiecka	Markgrafen
Legionowa	Hamann
Marczukowska	Gotenhafener
Marmurowa	Marmer
Mazowiecka	Hochmeister
Mickiewicza	Reichsmarachall
Młynowa	Mühlen
Modrzewiowa	Albrecht
Niecała	Kirchen
Nowy Świat	Heidelberger
Odeska	Bromberger
Piłsudskiego	Langasse
Poleska	Preussisch
Pułaskiego	Heerbann
Sienkiewicza	Erich Koch
Sienny Rynek	Neuer Markt
Słonimska	Reinhard-Heydrich
Sosnowa	Nürnberger
Szlachecka	Posener
Szosa do Supraśla	Suprasler
Szosa do Zambrowa	Sürdring
Św. Rocha	Tannenberg
Świętojańska	Kant
Kościałkowskiego	Am Schlosspark
Wierzbowa	Trakenher
Wspólna	Hohenfriedberger
Zamenhofa	Grüne
Zwierzyniecka	Boeloke
Żelazna	Lobeer

=== Polish People's Republic (1945-1989) ===
With the establishment of the Communist regime in Poland and the inclusion of Białystok in the People's Republic new borders, the new authorities began massive renaming of streets to resemble Communist and Soviet identity and culture. While renaming of existing streets and naming of new streets was done throughout the communist period, two clear periods can be defined, the first period, of high stalinism which occurred from 1947 to 1956 and the later period, from 1956 until the end of communism in 1989/1990 when the Polish People's Republic was a bit more independent from the Soviet Union within the communist bloc and was allowed to combine the communist identity, together with local one.

From 1947 into the early 1950s, the Białystok City National Council (municipal parliament), adopted a series of resolutions to rename many streets. Among them are the following:

Old name	New name	Year
Argentyńska	Bułgarska	1949
Białostoczańska	Produkcyjna	1951
Białostoczańska	Włókiennicza	1954
Bożnicza	Bohaterów Getta	1949
Aleja 11 Listopada	Aleja Sportowa	1951
Aleja 11 Listopada	Aleja Sportowa	1954
Akademicka	Rokossowskiego	1949
Branickiego	Lenina	1949
Chazanowicza	Worcella	1949
Grochowa	Ostrowskiego	1954
Książęca	Proletariacka	1949
Sienkiewicza	1 May	1949
Św. Rocha	Manifestu Lipcowego	1949
Legionowa	Dzierżyńskiego	1949
Lipowa	Stalina	1949
Słonimska	Wolna	1951
Trochimowska	Przytorowa	1954
Wołodyjowskiego	Wróblewskiego	1951
Wołodyjowskiego	Gwardii Ludowej	1954
Wójtowska	Gminna	1951
Serwitutowa	Jęczmienna	1951
Żydowska	Fornalska	1955
Żwirki i Wigury	Marchlewskiego	1950
Świętojańska	Nowotki	1949

Following the October 1956 Thaw, a number of streets were renamed (either reverted or were given new name) to emphasize Soviet and communist identity to local, Polish one:

Old name	New name
Stalina	Lipowa
1 May	Sienkiewicza
Rokossowskiego	Akademicka
Olejniczaka	Skłodowskiej-Curie
Sienkiewicza	Olejniczaka

=== Streets that ceased to exist as a result of the construction of new housing estates ===
Antoniuk

1. Jastrzębia
2. Alta
3. Dobrzyniewska
4. Tykocińska

Bema

1. Kresowa
2. Mierosławskiego
3. Czwartaków
4. Myszyniecka
5. Podlaska
6. Wołyńska
7. Łowiecka
8. Litewska

Piasta

1. Majowa
2. Grzybowa
3. Okopowa
4. Graniczna

Tysiąclecia

1. Browarna
2. Mała
3. Gęsi Dwór

=== Modern Poland ===
Following the collapse of the Communist regime in Poland and the establishment of the Third Polish Republic (modern Republic of Poland), the new elected authorities began a process of decommunization which included the removal of Communist names and ideas from public spaces. As such a new wave of renaming began in Białystok. The process of renaming included reverting to the old and original names of many streets and in some cases to a different new names: Marcelego Nowotki changed in 1990 to Świętojańska, Lenina changed to Branickiego, Stalingradzka to Litewska, Arkadiusza Łaszewicza to Magnoliowa, Feliks Kona to Lawendowa, Władysława Pragi to Konwaliowa, Ryszard Kraśki to Storczykowa, a section of Karola Świerczewskiego to 11 Listopada, Feliks Dzierżyńskiego to Legionowa, Juliana Marchlewski to Pałacowa, Marceli Nowotki to Świętojańska, Swobodna to Dworska, Mikołaja Ostrowskiego to Grochowa, Mariana Buczka to Meksykańska, Stanisława Juchnickiego to Sukienna, Bronisława Wesołowskiego to Suraska and Zygmunta Berlinga to Józefa Hallera. Baranowicka was called Armii Radzieckiej from 1968 and 1991, and before that Szosa Wschodnia. Bialowny Street was called Malgorzaty Fornalskiej from 1955 to 1990, and before that Zydowska. Ciolkowskiego was called before 1968 Szosa Zamborwska. Grochowa Street was called Mikołaja Ostrowskiego between 1954 and 1990. Jana Pawla II was called Szosa Żółtkowska before 1968. Kopernika was called before 1968 Szosa Południowa. Lawendowa was called before 1989 Feliksa Kona. Liniarskiego was called from 1956 to 1990 Edwarda Próchniaka. Maczka and Kleeberga were called Szosa Północno-Obwodowa. Narodowych Sil Zbrojnych was called before 2001 Szosa Ełcka. Hanki Ordonówny was called from 1966 to 1991 Wandy Wasilewskie. Palacowa was called Juliana Marchlewskiego from 1950 to 1989. Raginisa was called Szosa Supraślska before 1968. Sw. Rocha was called Manifestu Lipcowego from 1949 to 1990. Sienkiewicza was called I Maja from 1949 to 1956. Skłodowskiej-curie was called Olejniczaka before 1956 and before that Piwna. Aleje solidarności was called Gagarina street from 1968 to 1996. Waszyngtona was called from 1974 to 1990 Bolesława Podedwornego and before that Garbarska

Decommunization in 80. 90.
Old name	New name	Year
Aleja 1 May	Piłsudskiego	1990
Armii Radzieckiej	Baranowicka	1991
Dzierżyńskiego	Legionowa	1989
Fornalskiej	Białówny	1990
Gagarina	Aleja Solidarności	1996
Gomułki	Popieluszki	1990
Juchnickiego	Sukienna	1990
Kraśki	Storczykowa	1989
Lubinieckiego	Waszyngtona	1990
Podedwornego	Waszyngtona	1990
Lenina	Branickiego	1990
Łaszewicza	Magnoliowa	1989
Próchniaka	Liniarskiego	1990
Przodowników Pracy	Bohaterów Monte Cassino	1981
Stalingradzka	Litewska	1990
Stąpora	Mieszka I	1981
Świerczewskiego	11 listopada	1989–1990
Wesołowskiego	Suraska	1990
Mistrzów Plonów	Wyszyńskiego	1981
Marchlewskiego	Pałacowa	1989
Nowotki	Świętojańska	1989
Olejniczaka	Boboli	1990

Decommunization in 10.
Old name	New name	Year
Wojsk Ochrony Pogranicza	Depowa	2016
Berlinga	Hallera	2016
Armii Ludowej	Twardowskiego	2016
Kruczkowskiego	Gajcego	2017
Rzymowskiego	Świętego Jerzego	2017
27 lipca	42. Pułku Piechoty	2013
I Armii Wojska Polskiego	Bitwy białostockiej	2017
