= Organizacja Bojowa =

Organizacja Bojowa means military organization in Polish. In particular, the term may refer to:

- Antyfaszystowska Organizacja Bojowa
- Organizacja Bojowa PPS
- Socjalistyczna Organizacja Bojowa
- Żydowska Organizacja Bojowa
