= Płoska =

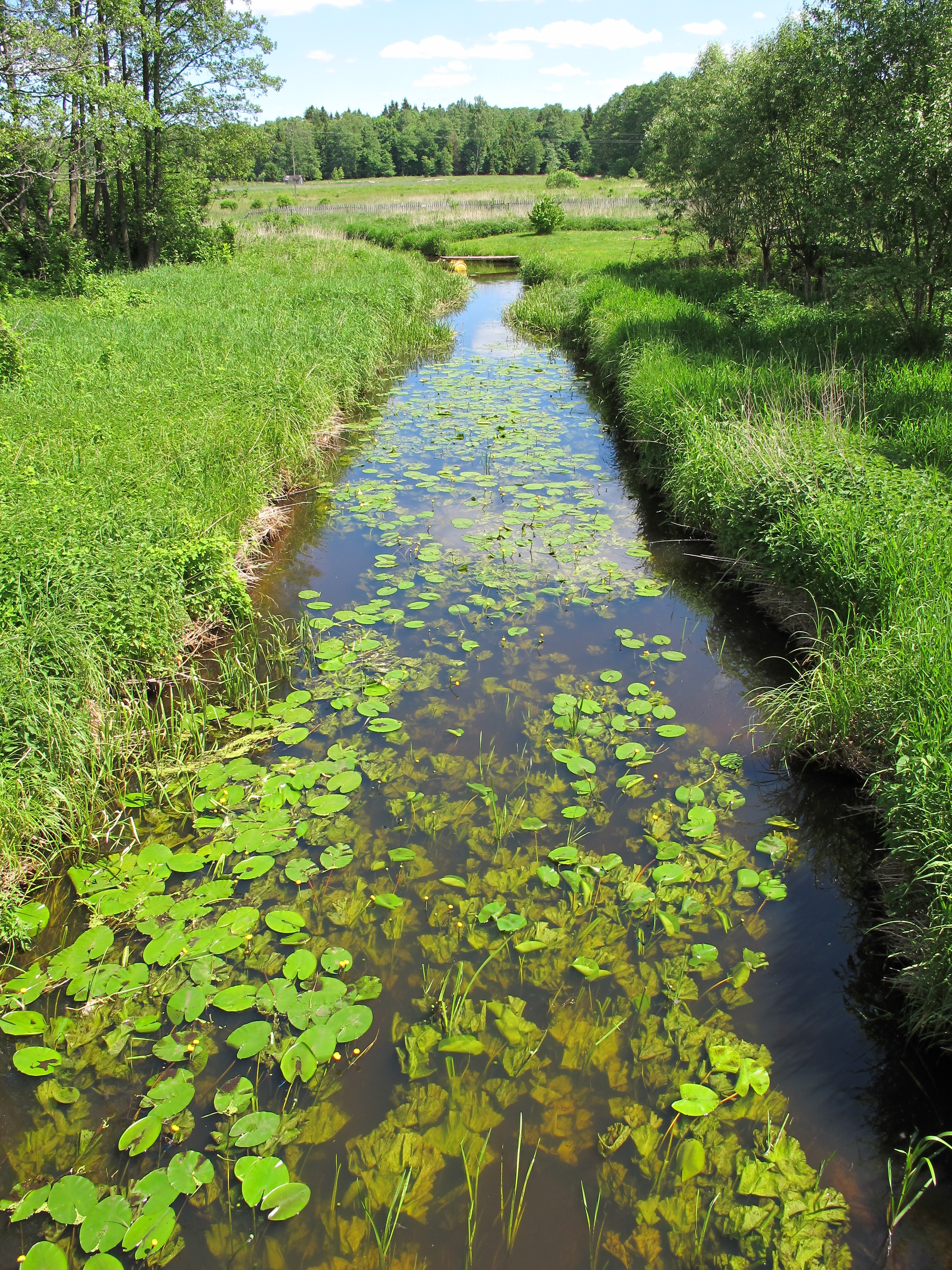
- Płoska near village Zajma

Location
- Country: Poland

Physical characteristics
- Source
  - location: near village Tatarowce
- Mouth
  - location: Supraśl near Krzemienne
  - coordinates: 53°11′38″N 23°24′28″E
- Length: 23.6 km (14.7 mi)
- Basin size: 216 km^{2} (83 sq mi)
- Discharge
  - average: 0.92 m^{3}/s (32 cu ft/s)

Basin features
- Progression: Supraśl→ Narew→ Vistula→ Baltic Sea

Płoska – is a river in east Poland in Podlaskie Voivodeship, a left tributary of the Supraśl River, with a length of 23,6 kilometres and the basin area of 216 km^{2}. There is a good river for rafting. The largest tributary is Świniobródka.
