= Statue of Władysław Bartoszewski (Białystok) =

Monument in Białystok, Poland

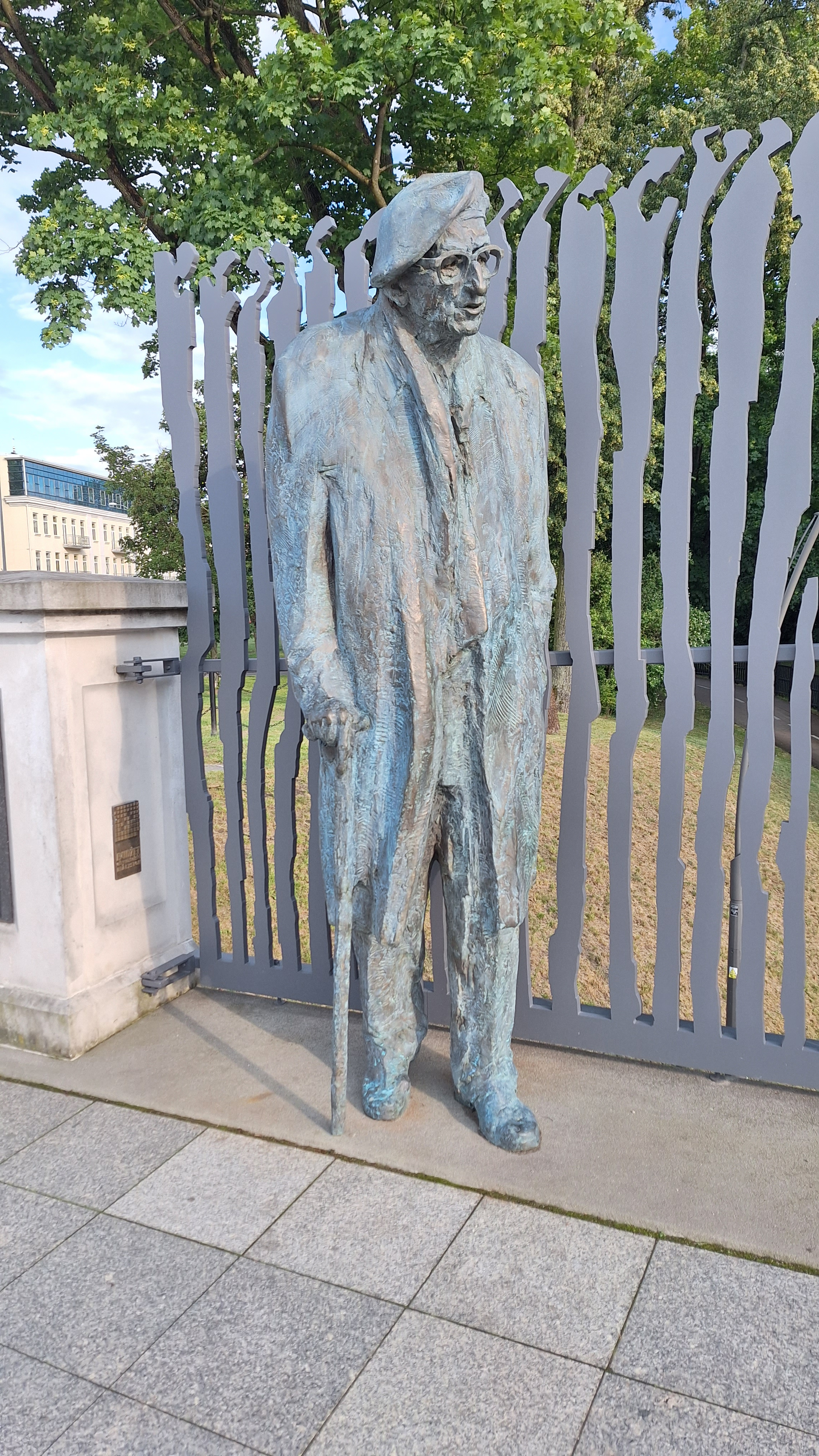
- The statue in 2023
- Interactive map of Statue of Władysław Bartoszewski
- Location: Władysław Bartoszewski Bridge, Centre, Białystok, Poland
- Coordinates: 53°07′54.938″N 23°10′06.076″E
- Designer: Jacek Kiciński
- Type: Statue
- Material: Bronze
- Opening date: 12 December 2022
- Dedicated to: Władysław Bartoszewski

The statue of Władysław Bartoszewski (Polish pronunciation: [vwaˈdɘ̟.swaf bar.tɔˈʂɛf.skʲi]; Polish: Pomnik Władysława Bartoszewskiego) is a monument in Białystok, Poland, within the neighbourhood of Centrum. It is placed at the Władysław Bartoszewski Bridge on the Biała river, connecting Branicki Square and Andrzej Piotr Lussa Square. It was designed by Jacek Kiciński, and unveiled on 12 December 2022. The monument has the form of a bronze statue, depicting Władysław Bartoszewski, a 20th- and 21st-century academic, activist, writer, journalist, politician, and diplomat. In 1942, while Warsaw was under the German occupation during the Second World War, Bartoszewski joined the Home Army underground resistance, and the Council to Aid Jews, and in 1944, he fought in the Warsaw Uprising. After the war, he was the ambassador of Poland in Austria from 1990 to 1995, the Minister of Foreign Affairs of Poland from 1990 to 1995 and from 2000 to 2001, and the chairperson of the Council for the Protection of Struggle and Martyrdom Sites from 2001 to 2015.

== History ==
The monument was proposed by the residents of Białystok, and financed as part of the 2021 local participatory budgeting program. The monument was dedicated to Władysław Bartoszewski, a 20th- and 21st-century academic, activist, writer, journalist, politician, and diplomat. In 1942, while Warsaw was under the German occupation during the Second World War, he joined the Home Army underground resistance, and the Council to Aid Jews, and in 1944, he fought in the Warsaw Uprising. After the war, Bartoszewski was a lecturer at the John Paul II Catholic University of Lublin, Ludwig-Maximilians-Universität München, and University of Augsburg. He was the ambassador of Poland in Austria from 1990 to 1995, the Minister of Foreign Affairs of Poland from 1990 to 1995 and from 2000 to 2001, and the chairperson of the Council for the Protection of Struggle and Martyrdom Sites from 2001 to 2015. Bartoszewski was awarded with the Order of the White Eagle, and the title of the Righteous Among the Nations. The statue was designed by sculptor Jacek Kiciński, and unveiled on 12 December 2022. The ceremony was attended by Mark Brzezinski, the ambassador of the United States to Poland, and Władysław Teofil Bartoszewski, a member of the Sejm of Poland and Władysław Bartoszewski's son. The state was placed on the Władysław Bartoszewski Bridge on the Biała river, connecting Branicki Square and Andrzej Piotr Lussa Square. It received its name on 20 December 2022.

== Characteristics ==
The bronze statue depicts Władysław Bartoszewski in an elderly age, wearing a suit with a glasses and a military beret, supporting himself with a walking cane held in his right hand. It is placed the Władysław Bartoszewski Bridge on the Biała river, connecting Branicki Square and Andrzej Piotr Lussa Square. A commemorative plaque is embedded in a wall next to the monument, with the following inscription in Polish:

Polish inscription

Władysław Bartoszewski
19.02.1922 – 24.04.2015

Historyk, pisarz, dyplomata,
więzień niemieckiego obozu Auschwitz,
działacz opozycji antykomunistycznej,
minister spraw zagranicznych,
Sprawiedliwy Wśród Narodów Świata,
kawaler Orderu Orła Białego,
nie milczał i nie był obojętnym.

Białystok, 2022 r.

Translation:
English translation

Władysław Bartoszewski
19 February 1922 – 24 April 2015

A historian, writer, diplomat,
prisoner of the German Auschwitz concentration camp
member of the anti-communist opposition,
the minister of foreign affairs,
the Righteous Among the Nations,
the knight of the Order of the White Eagle,
he did not stay quiet, and was not indifferent.

Białystok, 2022

== Gallery ==
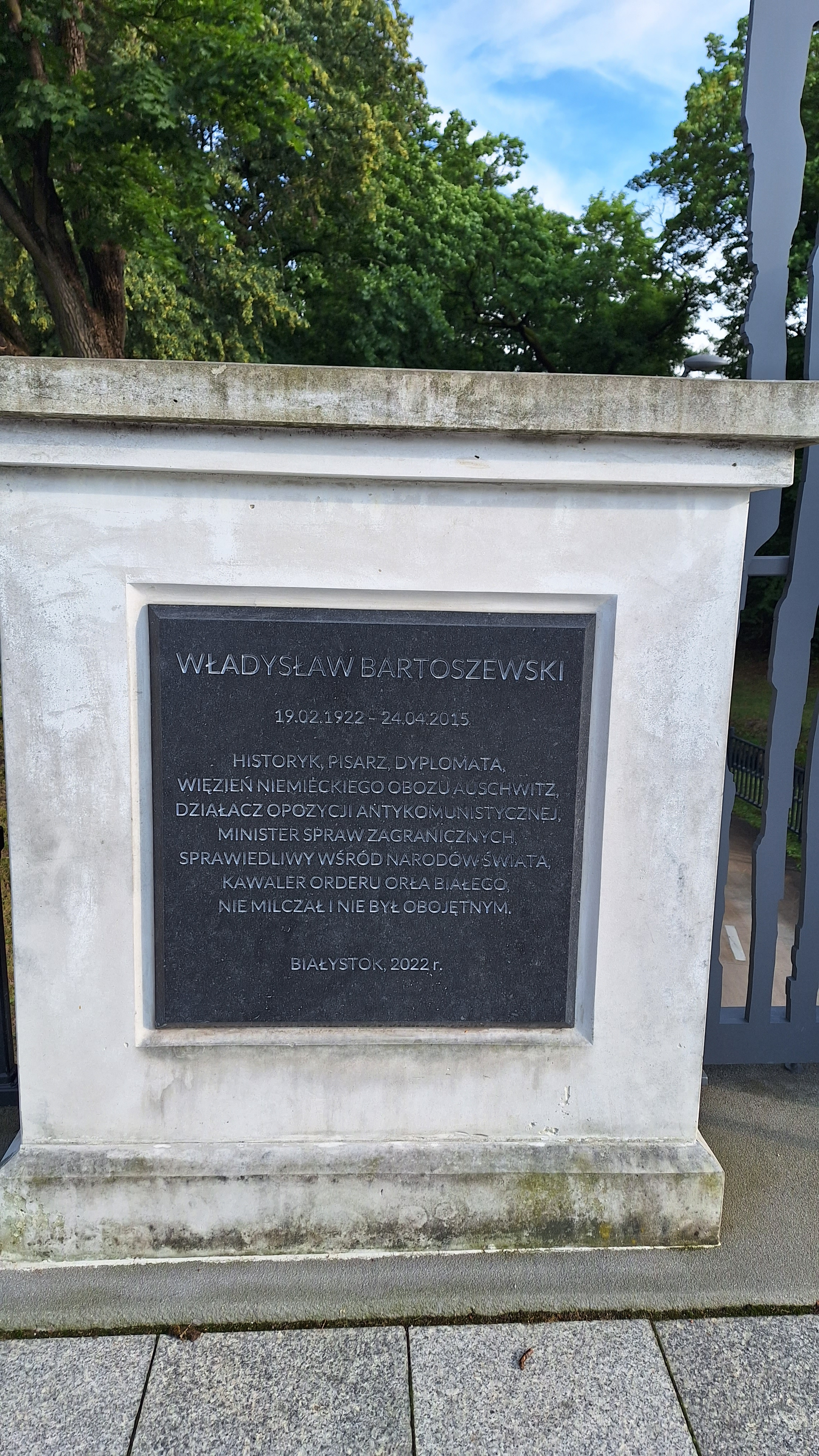
The commemorative plaque next to the statue.
