= Zeligman =

Zeligman is a surname of Polish Jewish origin. Notable people with this surname include:

- Shalom Zeligman, an Israeli bridge player (see World Senior Teams Championship and Bermuda Bowl)
- Józef Zeligman, a Polish Jew who founded a multicultural high school in Białystok, Poland
