= Factory of Białystok Association of Manufacture =

Textile factory in Bialystok

- Fabryka Towarzystwa Białostockiej Manufaktury
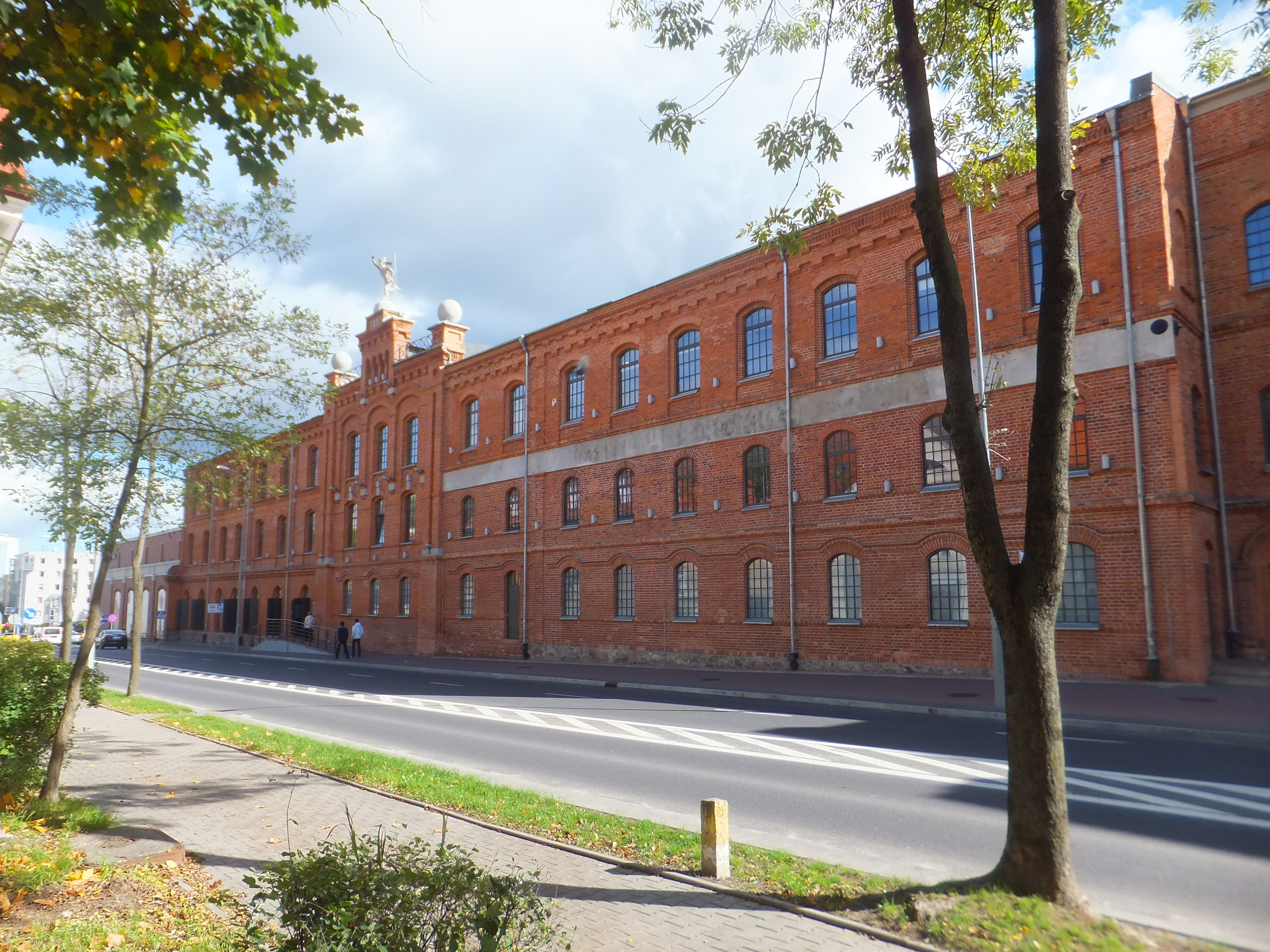

General information
- Status: Shopping center
- Location: ul. Świętojańska 15A, Białystok
- Coordinates: 53°07′32″N 23°10′7″E
- Year built: 1895
- Designations: Register of monuments

The factory building of the Białystok Association of Manufacture is a structure in Białystok, Poland. It was owned by Eugen Becker & Co., a German company. The factory contributed to the historical textile industry in Białystok, and it is on the register of monuments in Poland.

== History ==
The factory was founded by Germans in 1895 in what was then the Grodno Governorate of the Russian Empire. At that time, Germans made up many of the industrialists operating in neighboring Congress Poland. The Becker factory produced plush.

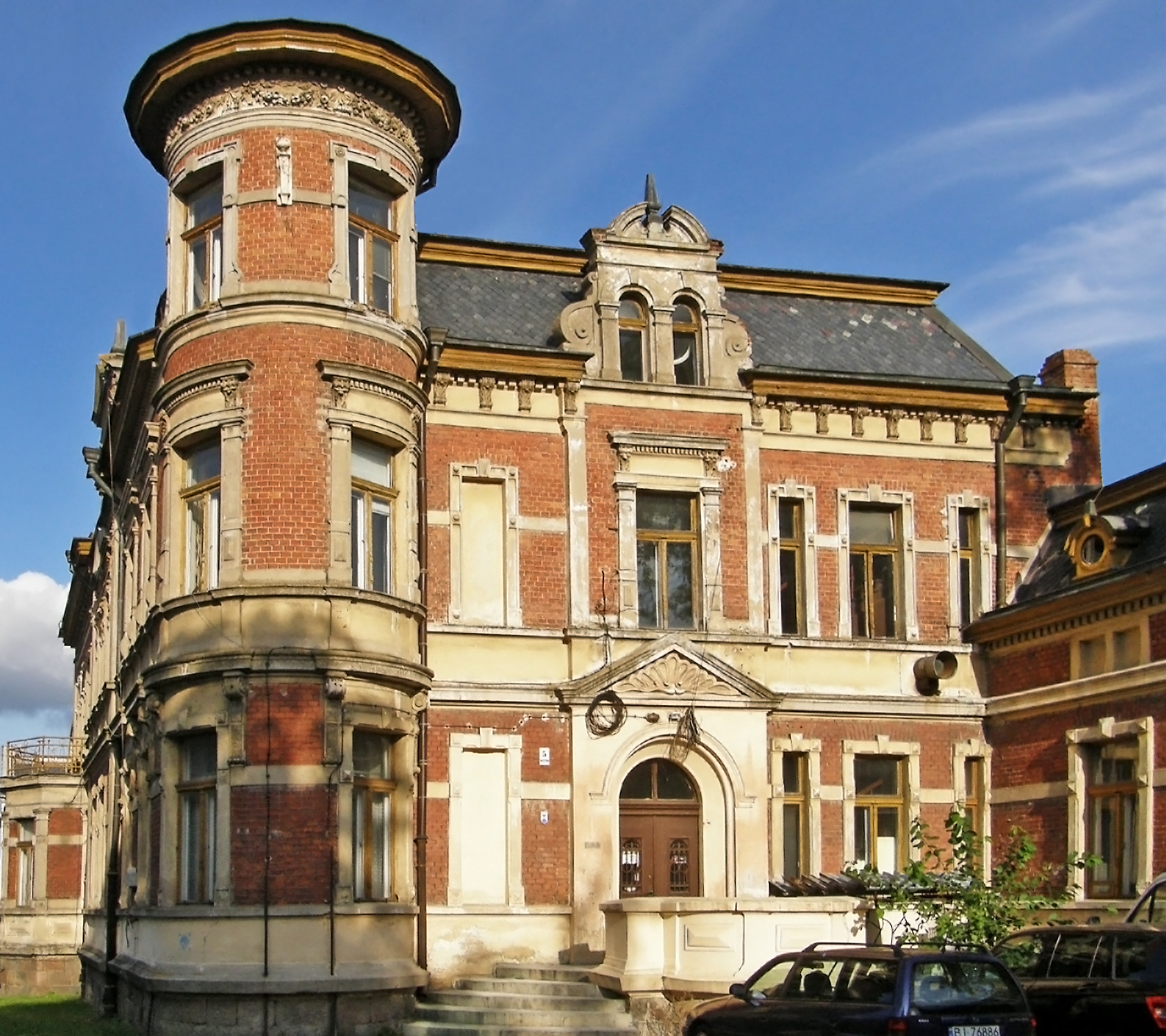
Board house from 1905

The factory was one of the largest in Białystok by the start of World War I, and it employed up to 300 people. The site featured storage, mills, a dyeworks, and stables.

Historian Feliks Tych edited the testimony of a man who, during World War II, was "arrested" and "sent off to Białystok [and] placed in the factory of the Becker company, where there were already thousands of Poles, Ukrainians, and Belorussians." After World War II, the factory was nationalized and produced textiles until 2007. In 2008, the structure became a shopping gallery.

== Description ==
The site features a board house in the Neo-Renaissance style.

== See also ==
- Textile industry
- Economy of Congress Poland
