= Lonka Korzybrodska =

Polish Jewish resistance fighter

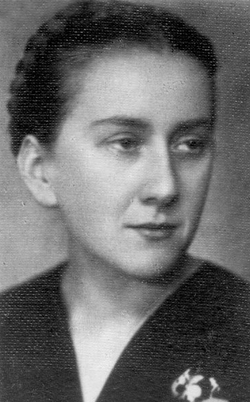
Lonka Korzybrodska (picture possibly taken at the time of the Gestapo Christmas party in 1941)

Lonka Korzybrodska (1917–1943), also known as Leah-Lonka Kozibrodska, was a member of the Jewish resistance in Poland during the Second World War. She adopted a Christian Polish identity, allowing her to work as a courier, smuggling messages, documents and money between resistance groups based in ghettos in Poland. On a mission to Warsaw, she was captured and imprisoned. After suffering months of torture and starvation, she was transferred to Birkenau, part of Auschwitz. She worked there as a translator but caught Typhus fever and died in March 1943.

== Early life ==
Korzybrodska was born in 1917 in Pruszków, on the western edge of Warsaw. Her father Avraham was a teacher, with a reputation for inspiring many of his pupils to become involved in pioneer youth movements. Lonka was educated in Polish schools and joined a Polish socialist youth group. She learned a wide range of languages, including Polish, Hebrew, Yiddish, German, French, English, Ukrainian and Russian.

== Activist ==
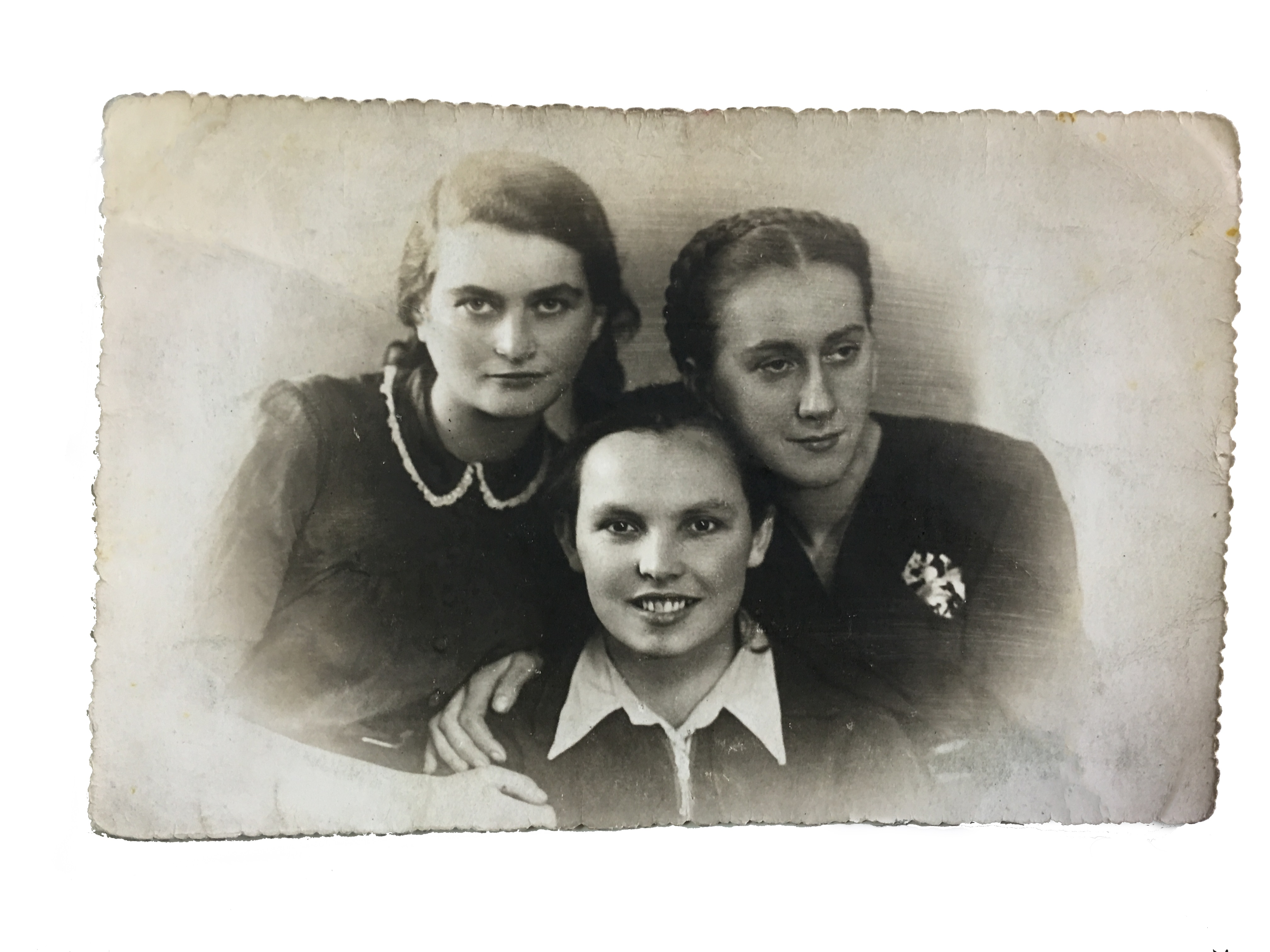
From left to right, Tema Schneiderman, Bela Hazan and Lonka Korzybrodska, taken at a Gestapo Christmas party, 1941

Korzybroska's elder brother David held a senior position in the HeHalutz/Dror movement and this led to her joining the movement as well. Once the Germans had occupied Poland, Kozybrodska volunteered to be a courier, due to her "Aryan" appearance. She adopted a Polish Christian identity, going by the name Kristina Kosowska. She travelled between the various large cities, carrying messages, documents, money, weapons and instructions between the resistance groups. Her knowledge of languages made it easy for her to deal with the various nationalities that she encountered during this work. She was often accompanied by Yitzhak Zuckerman, known as "Antek". Zuckerman later said of her that she was born for the role.

Late in December 1941, she and Tema Schneiderman were staying with their fellow courier Bela Hazan in Grodno, where she worked at the Gestapo headquarters. When Hazan was invited to the Gestapo Christmas party, Kozybrodska and Schneiderman found themselves being invited too, an occasion that resulted in a photograph being taken by one of the Gestapo officers, entirely unaware of their true identities. In January 1942, Kozybrodska travelled to Vilna (then Wilno, part of Poland, now Vilna/Vilnius, the capital of Lithuania), to look into reports of a massacre at Ponary.

== Imprisonment ==
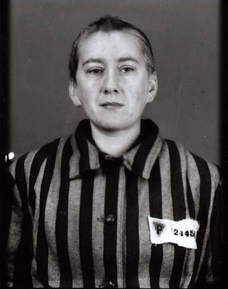
Lonka Korzybrodska photographed at Auschwitz-Birkenau

In April 1942, on another mission to Warsaw, she was arrested in possession of four revolvers at Malkinia railway station. She was sent to the notorious Pawiak prison, where she was starved and tortured. In June 1942, Hazan, who was sent to locate her once she had lost touch with the resistance, was captured in similar fashion, also ending up in Pawiak prison. Eventually the two were placed in the same cell, allowing them to reconnect. Hazan described her at that time as pale, emaciated and hard to recognise. Both Korzybrodska and Hazan managed to maintain their "Polish" identities, befriending other Polish inmates. From the prison yard, Korzybrodska threw notes into the neighbouring street, at least one of which was relayed back to Zuckerman.

Korzybrodska and Hazan, with 51 others, were transferred to Birkenau, part of Auschwitz, in November 1942. After a short period of hard labour in the fields, Korzybrodska's language skills were noticed and she found work as an interpreter in the camp office. In 1943, Korzybrodska and Hazan both caught Typhoid fever. Hazan recovered but Korzybrodska, who had also contracted mumps and dysentry, died aged 26 in her friend's arms. Hazan persuaded an SS doctor to let her take her friend's body to the morgue, where she recited the Kaddish.
