= Sokołda (river) =

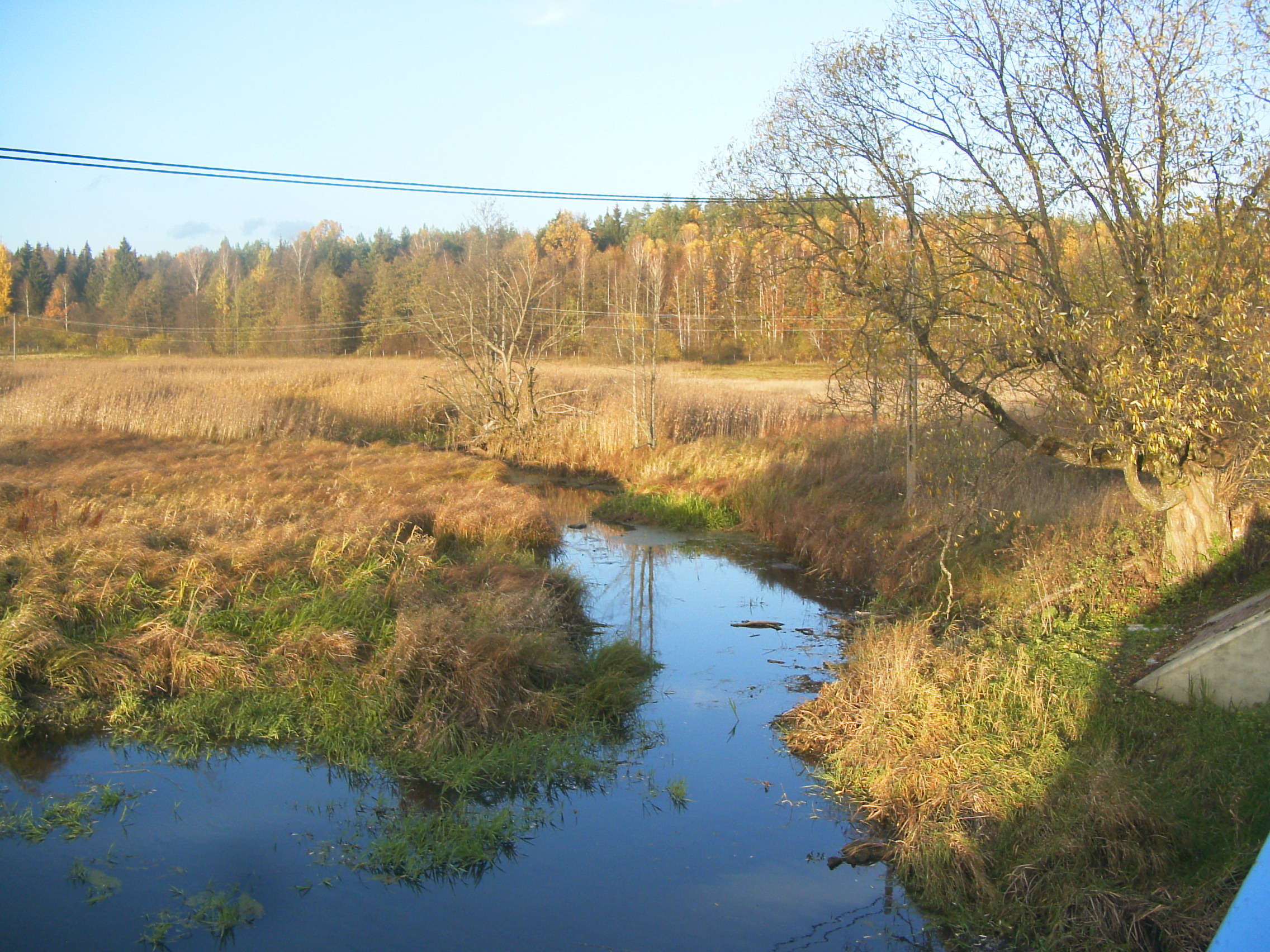
- Sokołda near village Sokołda

Location
- Country: Poland

Physical characteristics
- Source
  - location: near village Szyszki
- Mouth
  - location: Supraśl in Zasady
  - coordinates: 53°12′11″N 23°27′10″E
- Length: 93.8 km (58.3 mi)
- Basin size: 464 km^{2} (179 sq mi)

Basin features
- Progression: Supraśl→ Narew→ Vistula→ Baltic Sea

Sokołda is a river in east Poland in Podlaskie Voivodeship, a tributary of the Supraśl River, with a length of 57.5 kilometres and a basin area of 464 km^{2}.

== Tributaries ==
Major tributaries of Sokołda are:

- Poganica
- Jałówka
- Kamionka
