= Tema Schneiderman =

Jewish Polish resistance fighter (1917–1943)

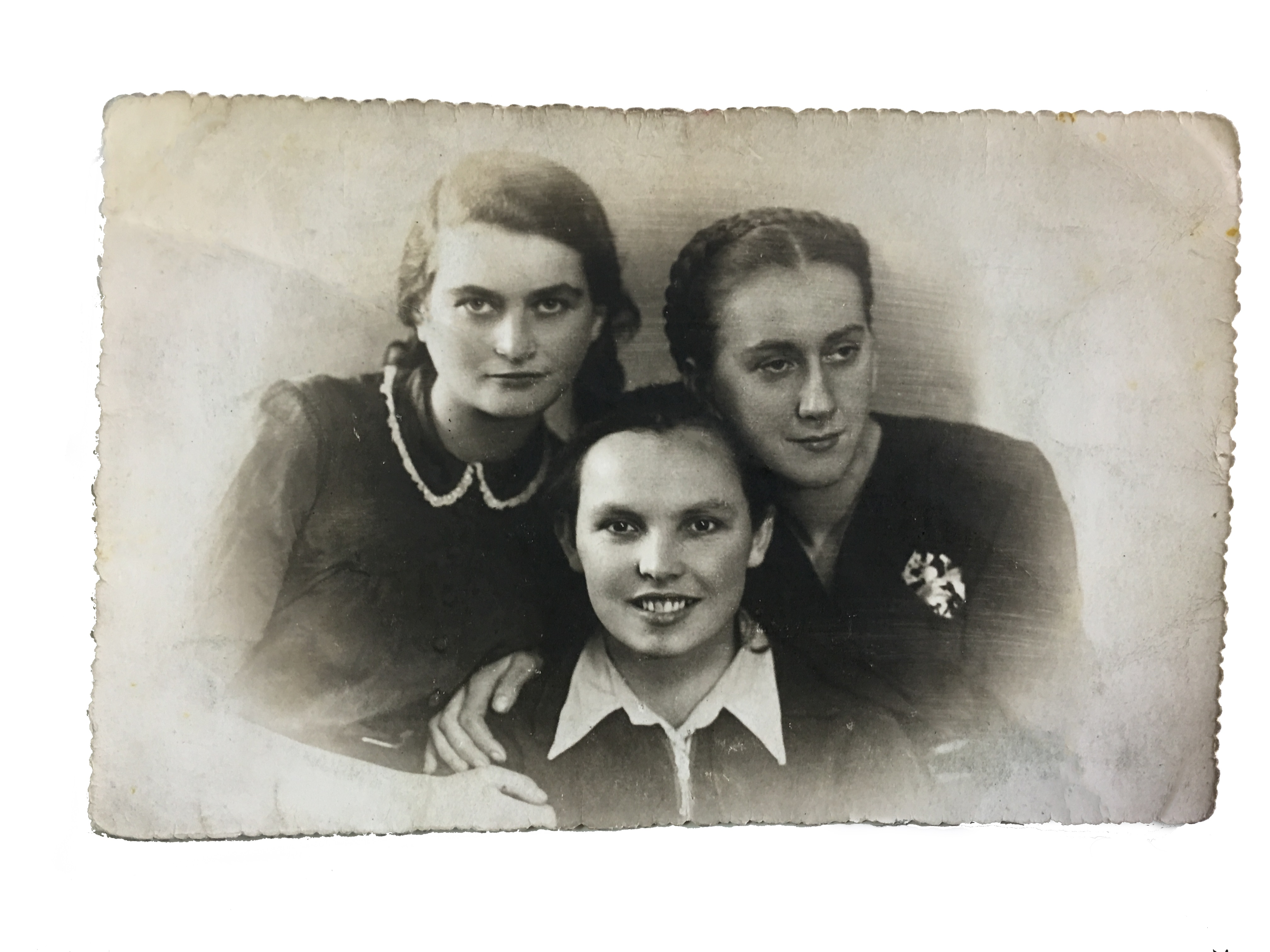
From left to right, Tema Schneiderman, Bela Hazan and Lonka Korzybrodska, taken at a Gestapo Christmas party, 1941

Tema Schneiderman (Tema Sznajderman) (born 1917 – died 18 January 1943) was a Jewish Polish woman who worked as a courier in the Jewish resistance in German-occupied Eastern Europe before and during World War II.

Born in 1917, she was one of a number of young Jewish women who traveled between Jewish ghettos to report on conditions, share information, reduce isolation, and encourage resistance. She was using documents under Polish name Wanda Majewska issued in Kraków on 14 May 1942. She was the close comrade-in-arms and later wife of Mordechai Tenenbaum, a leader of the Jewish resistance organisation.

Schneiderman was especially active in the ghettos in Warsaw, Vilnius, and Białystok. On 17 January 1943, she entered the Warsaw ghetto. The following day, she was captured in the Warsaw Ghetto and deported to the Treblinka death camp, where she was murdered.

A photograph of Tema along with some friends was included at Brandeis as part of the exhibit titled "Lives Eliminated, Dreams Illuminated" in 2023.
