= Bela Yaari Hazan =

Polish Jewish World War II resistance fighter (1922–2004)

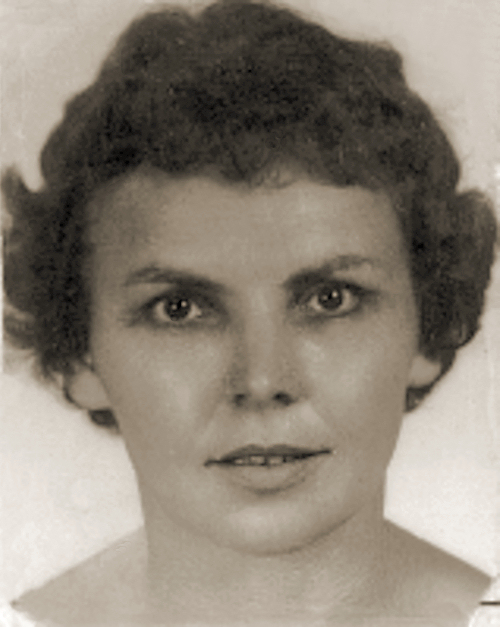
- Bela Yaari Hazan, 1962
- Born: December 1922; Rozhyshche, Poland
- Died: 18 January 2004 (aged 81); Jerusalem
- Known for: Polish Jewish resistance in the Second World War

Bela Yaari Hazan (December 1922 – 18 January 2004) was a member of the Jewish resistance in Poland during the Second World War. She took on a Christian Polish identity and worked as a courier, passing information, money and arms between various ghettos. She was eventually imprisoned, tortured and sent to concentration camps, all the while maintaining her false identity. She worked as a nurse in the various camps that she found herself in, assisting resistance groups in the camps and getting medicine to Jewish inmates. She survived disease, hard labour, starvation and finally attempts by an SS squad to kill all the remaining prisoners in her final camp by helping move them overnight to the safety of approaching American troops. After liberation she went to France and then Italy, resuming her Jewish identity, before migrating to Israel in late 1945. After writing her memoirs They Called Me Bronislawa, she married and spent the rest of her life in Israel with her family. Many years after her death she was awarded the "Jewish Rescuer Citation" by B'nai B'rith.

== Early life ==
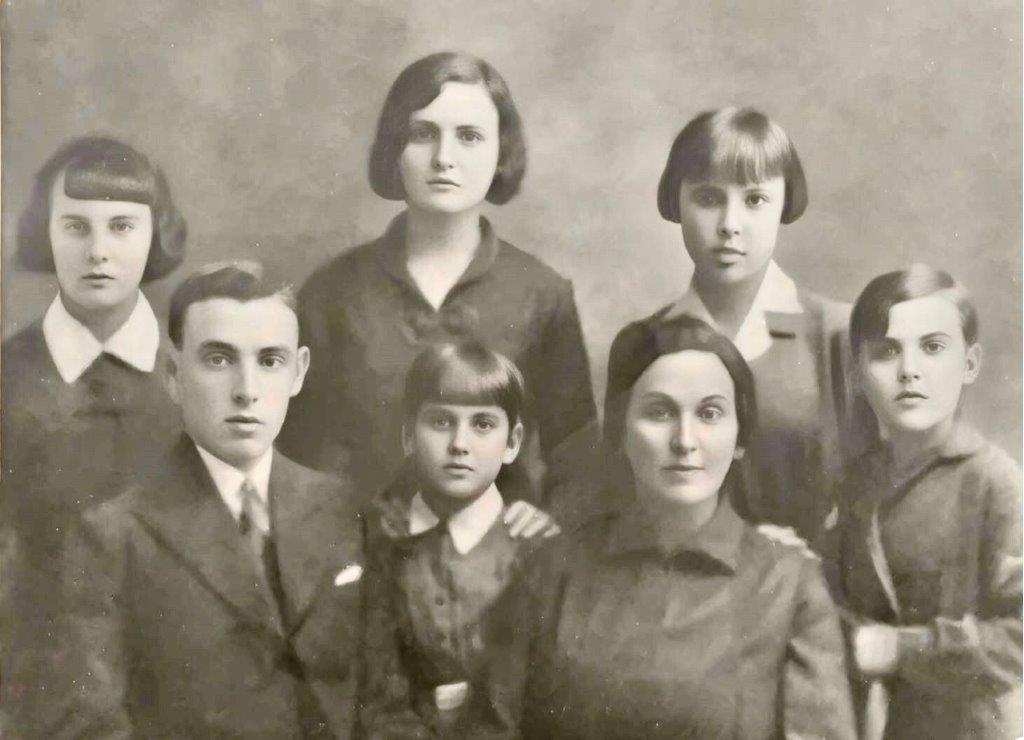
Bela (top right) photographed with her family in 1937

Born in Rozhyshche, Poland (now part of Ukraine) in December 1922 to David and Esther Hazan, who had eight children in all. Her father died when she was six, leaving her mother to support the family from the grocery shop that she owned. Hazan was educated at a Hebrew language Tarbut school, moving on to an ORT vocational school in Kowel.

== Halutzim ==
By the age of 16 Hazan had joined the HeHalutz Jewish youth movement, which gave young people agricultural training to prepare them for settling in the Land of Israel. In mid-1939 she was sent on a Haganah self-defence course in Zielonka. She used this knowledge to become a combat instructor at the kibbutz training programme at Bedzin. On 1 September 1939 Poland was invaded by Germany and Soviet Russia. After unsuccessfully trying to escape the advancing German forces, Hazan and her HeHalutz colleagues heard that Wilno (now Vilna) (then part of Poland, now capital of Lithuania) remained free. In October 1940, Hazan, with nine other "halutzim" set off to travel almost 2,000 km to reach Vilna. They were detained and imprisoned by Russian soldiers when they entered Soviet-held Poland, but were eventually released. They finally arrived in Vilna on 31 December 1939.

== Kashariyot ==
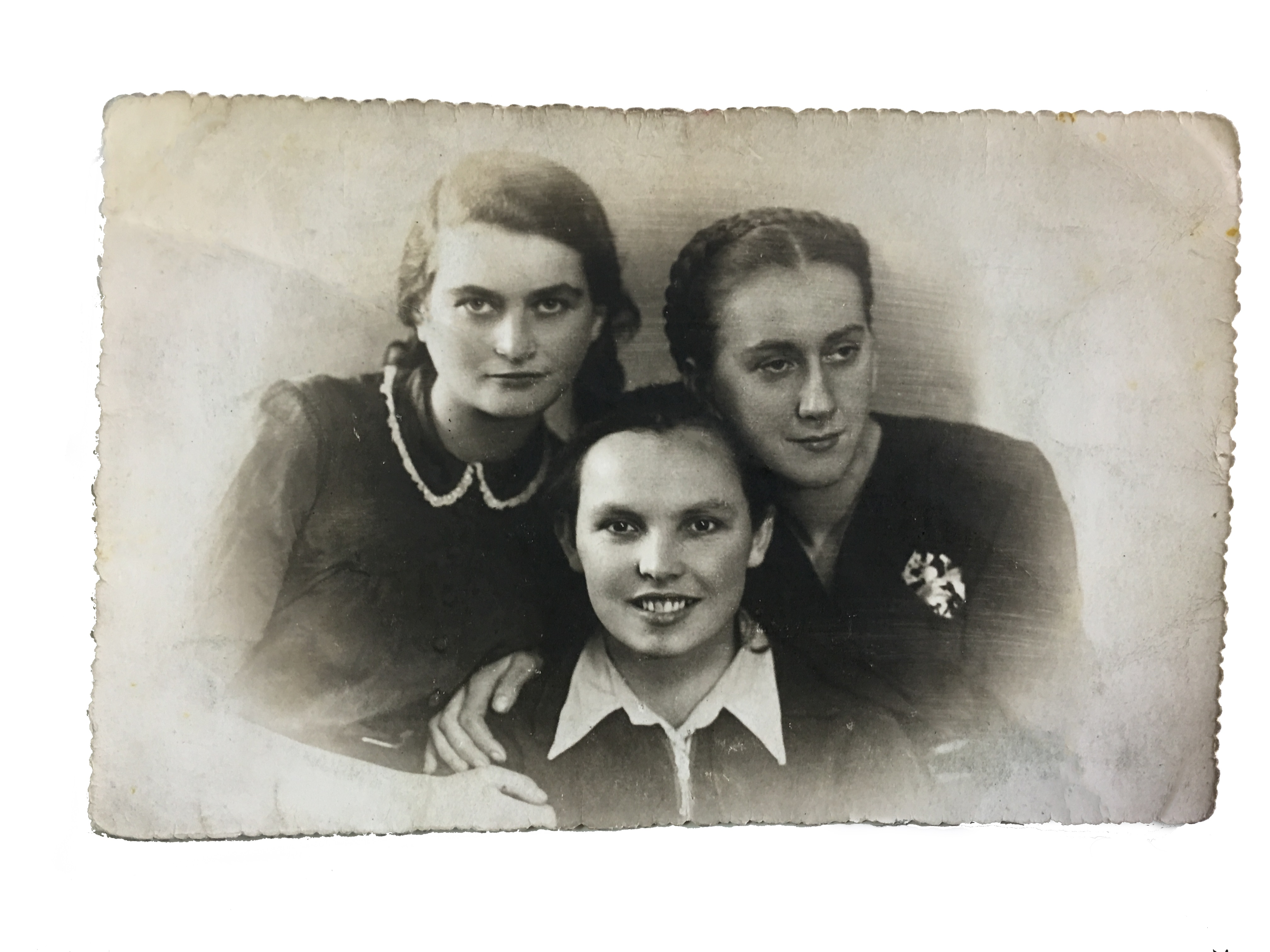
From left to right, Tema Schneiderman, Bela Hazan and Lonka Korzybrodska, taken at a Gestapo Christmas party, 1941

By late 1941, Vilna was also occupied by the Germans, who immediately started murdering the Jewish inhabitants. Hazan worked as a nurse for while in a hospital in the ghetto. Due to her Aryan appearance, Hazan then volunteered to act as a courier (kasharit) for the resistance, carrying messages, money and arms to resistance groups, between the ghettos of Vilna, Grodno, Lida, and Białystok. She adopted the name of a Polish woman that she knew, obtaining her passport, changing the photograph to become Bronislawa Limanowska, an identity she maintained throughout the war. She began wearing a crucifix and attending church regularly. She moved to Grodno, where her room became a meeting place for other couriers of the "Kashariyot". She obtained a job with the Gestapo as an interpreter, allowing her to steal documents and stationery that she passed on to the resistance. She was invited by one of the Gestapo officers to their Christmas party in 1941. Upon explaining that she had two friends staying with her, she was urged to bring them too. While at the party, one of the Gestapo officers took a picture of the three of them, Hazan, Tema Schneiderman and Lonka Korzybrodska, all three of them young Jewish women part of the Kashariyot, living with assumed Polish identities.

She entered the ghetto in Grodno and told the leadership there of the killing of Jews in Vilna. Although finding it hard to believe, they gave her money to allow her to help Jews to escape from the Vilna ghetto. With others she arranged for about 50 Jews to move from there to the ghetto in Białystok.

== Imprisonment ==
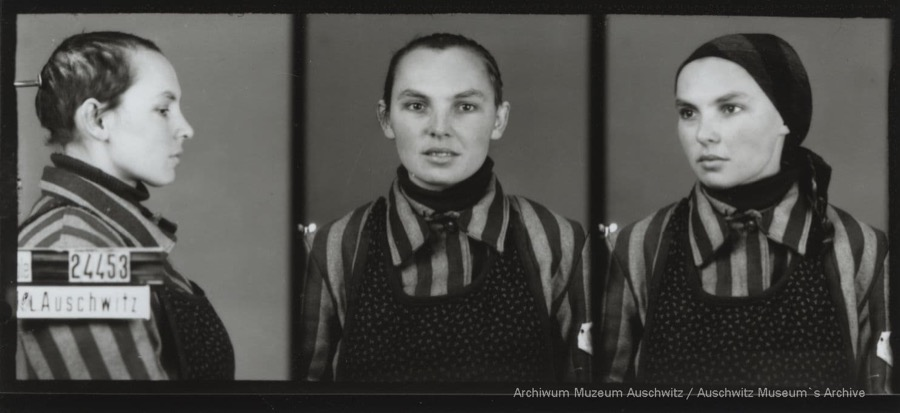
Bela Hazan's "mugshots" at Auschwitz

In June 1942, the resistance had lost touch with Hazan's friend and fellow courier Lonka Korzybrodska. Hazan was given the task of locating her in Warsaw. On her journey from Białystok to Warsaw, Hazan was arrested at Małkinia railway station and transferred to the Gestapo headquarters in Warsaw. There she was badly tortured, before being moved to the infamous Pawiak prison. Initially kept for weeks in a dark isolation cell, she was eventually moved to a cell with other Polish political prisoners. The Gestapo still assumed that she was a Polish resistance fighter. In that cell she found Korzybrodska; they suffered five further months of starvation and torture. On 13 November 1942, as part of a group of 53 women, they were transported to the women's camp at Birkenau, part of the Auschwitz concentration camp.

Initially Hazan and Korzybrodska were sent to the fields to do forced labour. Soon Hazan started working as a nurse in the women's camp's hospital, where she was able to smuggle medicine to the Jewish patients, who were otherwise deprived of them. She helped Jewish resistance groups within the camp and provided extra food for Jewish women that had been smuggled into the Polish section of the camp. She and Korzybrodska contracted Typhoid fever. Hazan eventually recovered but was unable to save her friend, who died in her arms on 13 April 1943. As Korzybrodska was thought to be a Christian, she was prayed for and an icon was placed with her body. Hazan persuaded the SS doctor to allow her to take her friend's body to the morgue herself, where she removed the icon and recited the Jewish prayer for the dead, the Kaddish. Late in 1944, Hazan was moved to the new women's expansion camp in Auschwitz, where she was put in charge of the infirmary.

Auschwitz was evacuated on 18 January 1945, with the inmates forced on a "death march" until they reached the German border after four days. There followed a series of journeys, firstly to Ravensbrück, then on to Malchow, where Hazan again worked as a nurse. She reached her final camp Taucha, near Leipzig, on 3 April 1945 with 1,000 others. She worked in the infirmary with Alexander Herman, a Jewish doctor from Prague. As American forces approached Leipzig, Tachau was evacuated, with all those capable of walking being sent on another death march. The other 140 inmates remained in the infirmary, being cared for by Hazan and Herman. As American forces got closer an SS group were sent out to kill the remaining inmates in the area. Warned by Polish prisoners that had escaped from an earlier massacre, Hazan and Herman, with help from some of the prisoners, successfully moved all the inmates through the night until they made contact with the Allies on 19 April 1945.

== Liberation ==
Following a spell in an American hospital in Leipzig, Hazan headed for Paris, where she dropped her assumed identity. In Paris she met with Jewish Brigade soldiers who took her with them to northern Italy. She moved on to southern Italy, reaching a Jewish displaced persons camp at Santa Maria al Bagno in Apulia. Here she worked with a group of orphaned girls, acting as teacher and counsellor. She named the group Frumka after Frumka Płotnicka who she had met in Zielonka in 1939. In early November the group embarked on the SS Princess Kathleen and arrived four days later in Haifa. They were held temporarily in the Atlit detainee camp before going to Ramat HaKovesh kibbutz. HeHalutz sent Hazan to another kibbutz, Givat Brenner, where she wrote her memoirs that were finally published in 1991 as a book entitled They Called Me Bronislawa.

== Later life ==
She married a former member of the Jewish Brigade and journalist Haim Zaleshinsky, whom she had met in Italy, on 5 January 1946. Zaleshinsky later changed his surname to Yaari. The couple moved to Tel Aviv and had two children, Esther and Yoel. She did not talk about her time in the war, wanting her children to grow up without the shadow of the Holocaust. Hazan died in Jerusalem on 18 January 2004 at the age of 81. More than 14 years after her death she was recognised for her "devotion, courage and heroism exhibited in rescuing fellow Jews in the Holocaust" when B'nai B'rith awarded her its "Jewish Rescuer Citation".
