= Icchok Malmed =

Polish Jew and World War II fighter

- Born: 1903; Brest-Litovsk
- Died: 8 September 1943 (aged 39–40); Białystok

Icchok Malmed (Yiddish: יצחק מאַלמעד; 1903 – 8 February 1943) was a Polish Jew and fighter of the Białystok Ghetto during the German occupation of Poland in World War II.

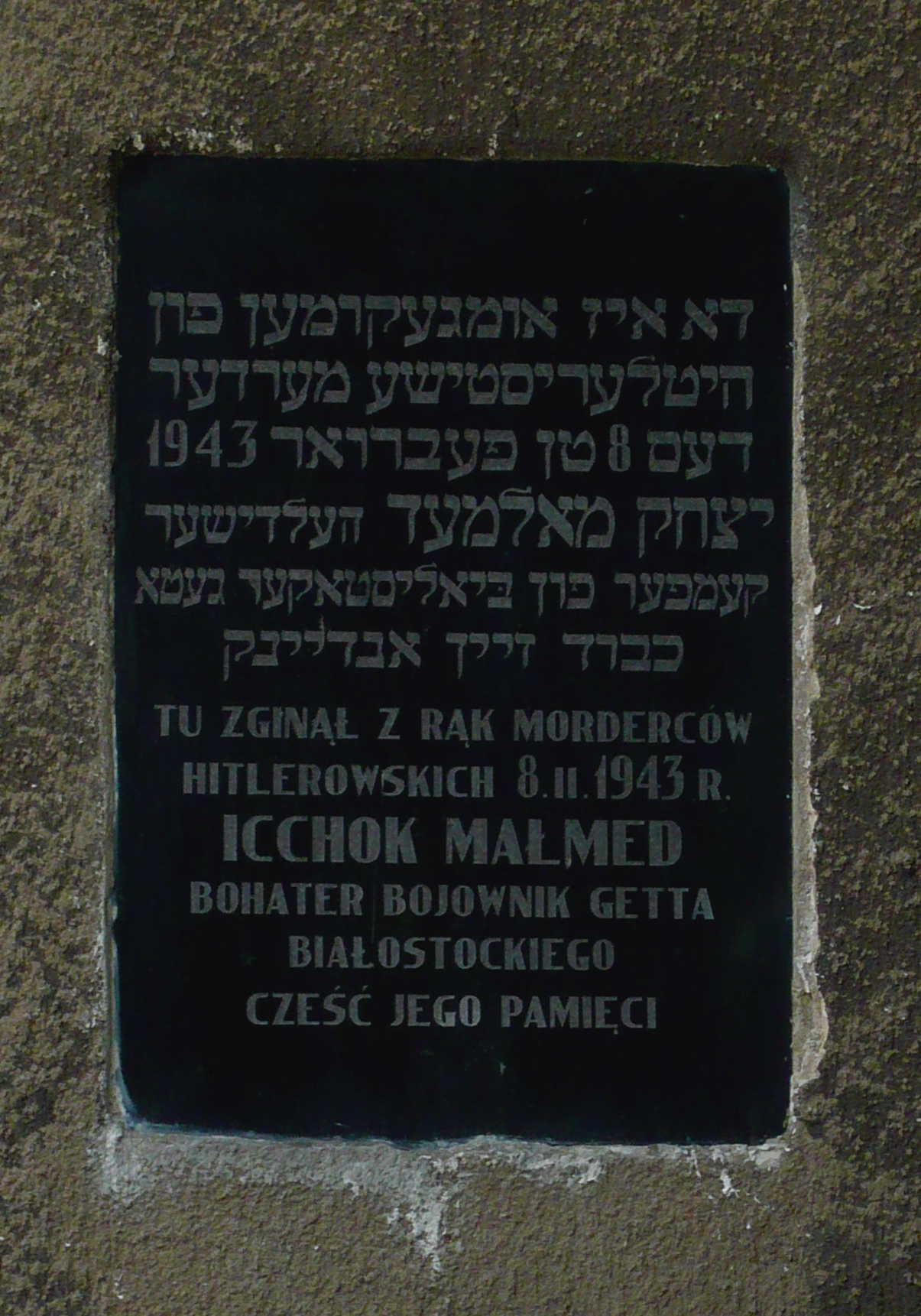
“Icchok Malmed, the hero and fighter of the Białystok Ghetto, was killed here by the Nazi murderers on 8 February 1943. In his honor.” (memorial plaque)

In January 1943, German soldiers started the liquidation of the ghetto in Białystok. When they attacked the house at ul. Kupiecka 29 (Kupiecka Street), rounding up all of its residents into the street, Malmed threw acid in the face of one of the SS-Soldiers. The sightless German fired his gun several times, hitting another SS-Soldier, killing him. In the melee Malmed managed to escape. For revenge, Germans shot one hundred men, women and children living in the area with machine guns.

The Gestapo commander Friedl issued an ultimatum for Malmed to surrender within 24 hours. Failing that, the entire ghetto would be destroyed. Malmed surrendered himself to the Germans.

Mordechaj Tenenbaum described in his diary Malmed's courage. Asked why he killed the German soldier, he replied: “I hate you. I regret I only killed one. Before my eyes my parents were murdered. Ten thousand Jews in Słonim were liquidated before me. I have no regrets.” Malmed was tortured and on the next day hanged near the square where the incident occurred. German soldiers riddled Malmed's corpse with bullets after the rope broke and the body fell to the earth and re-hanged it for another 48 hours.

Malmed is considered to be a "Hero of the Białystok Ghetto"; the ul. Kupiecka was renamed after the war to ul. Malmeda (Malmed Street).
