= Supraśl (river) =

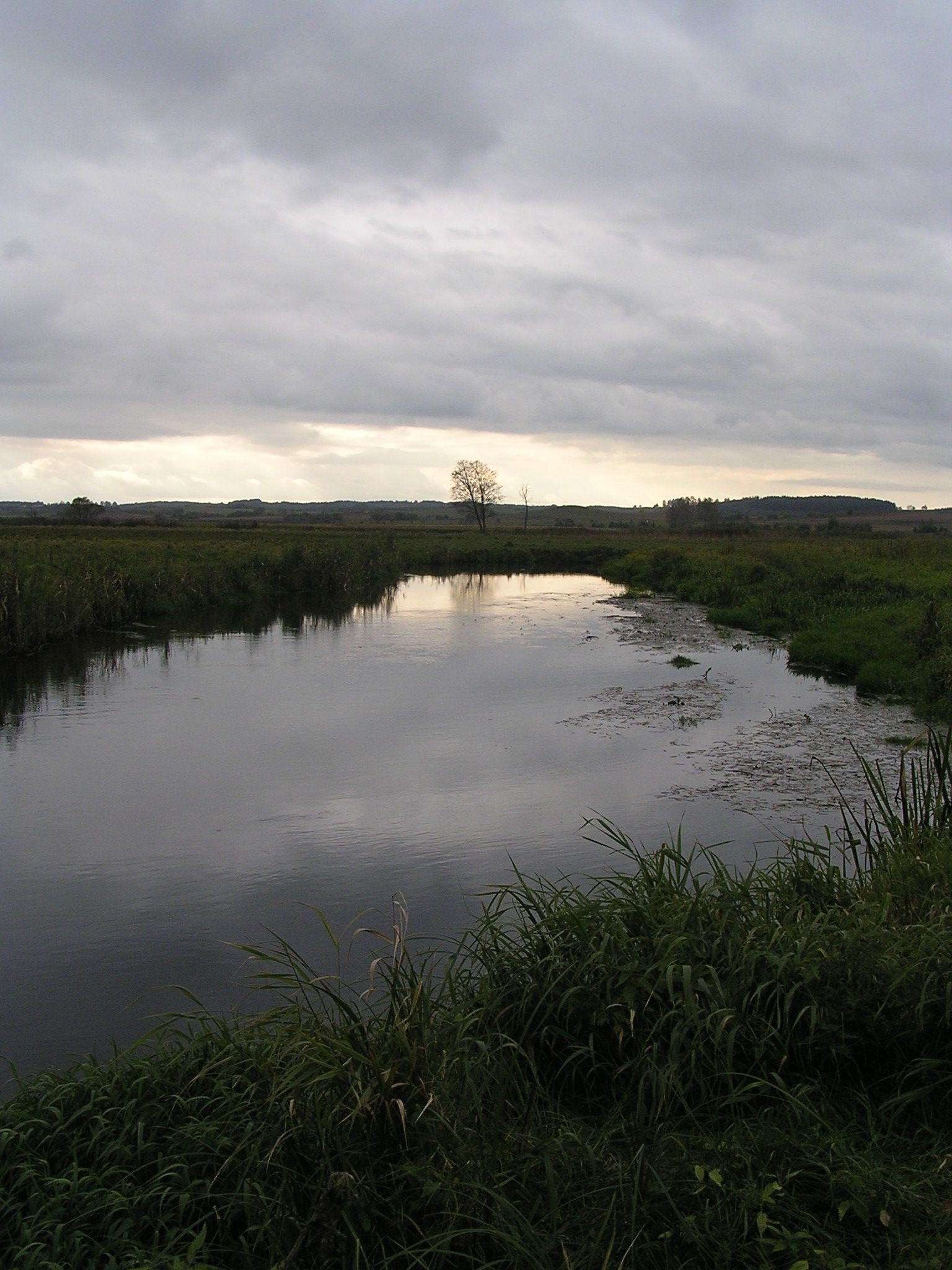
- Supraśl near village Studzianki

Location
- Country: Poland

Physical characteristics
- Source
  - location: near village Topolany
  - elevation: 110 m (360 ft)
- Mouth
  - location: Narew in Złotoria
  - coordinates: 53°10′39″N 22°56′15″E
- Length: 93.8 km (58.3 mi)
- Basin size: 1,844.4 km^{2} (712.1 sq mi)

Basin features
- Progression: Narew→ Vistula→ Baltic Sea

The Supraśl is a river in east Poland in Podlaskie Voivodeship, a tributary of the Narew river (near Złotoria), with a length of 93,8 kilometres and the basin area of 1,844.4 km^{2}.

Supraśl is the source of the drinking water for Białystok.

== Tributaries ==
Słoja (r), Sokołda (r), Kamionka (l), Płoska (l), Pilnica (l), Czarna (r), Biała (l)

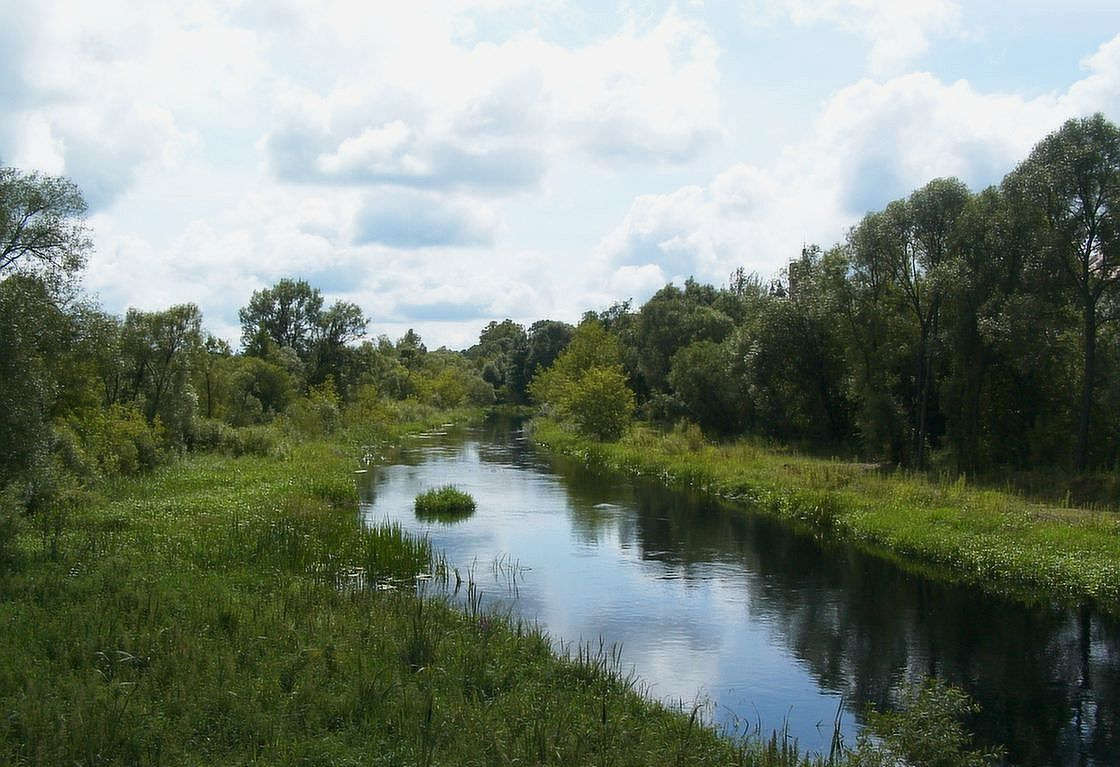
Supraśl River near city Supraśl

== Cities and towns ==
- Michałowo
- Gródek
- Supraśl
- Wasilków
