= Białystok Ghetto uprising =

Insurrection in the Jewish Białystok Ghetto

- Part of ghetto uprisings during World War II
| Date | 16–20 August 1943 |
| Location | Białystok Ghetto, Nazi occupied Poland |
| Result | Uprising suppressed |

Belligerents
| Germany; Gestapo, Waffen-SS | Jewish resistance; Anti-Fascist Military Organisation |

Commanders and leaders
| Odilo Globocnik | Mordechai Tenenbaum †; Daniel Moszkowicz † |

Strength
| | 300 to 500 |

Casualties and losses
| 9 Germans wounded | 11,200 deported to concentration camps |
- Several dozen to a few hundred reported to have escaped the ghetto to join partisans

The Białystok Ghetto uprising was an insurrection in the Jewish Białystok Ghetto against the Nazi German occupation authorities during World War II. The uprising was launched on the night of August 16, 1943 and was the second-largest ghetto uprising organized in Nazi-occupied Poland after the Warsaw Ghetto Uprising of April–May 1943. It was led by the Anti-Fascist Military Organisation (Antyfaszystowska Organizacja Bojowa), a branch of the Warsaw Anti-Fascist Bloc.

The revolt began upon the German announcement of mass deportations from the ghetto. The main objective was to break the German siege and allow the maximum number of Jews to escape into the neighboring Knyszyn Forest. A group of about 300 to 500 insurgents armed with 25 rifles and 100 pistols as well as home-made Molotov cocktails for grenades, attacked the overwhelming German force with a great loss of life. Leaders of the uprising committed suicide. Several dozen combatants managed to break through and run into the Knyszyn Forest where they joined other guerrilla groups.

== Background ==
The Białystok Ghetto was set up by Nazi Germany in occupied Poland soon after the German invasion of the Soviet Union. In February 1943, the first wave of mass deportations to Treblinka extermination camp took place, organized during country-wide Aktion Reinhard. The final liquidation of the ghetto was attempted on August 16, 1943, by regiments of the German SS reinforced by Ukrainian, Belarusian, and Latvian auxiliaries ("Hiwis"), known as the "Trawniki men" .

== Uprising ==
During the night of August 16, 1943, several hundred Polish Jews started an armed uprising against the troops carrying out liquidation of the ghetto. The guerillas led by Mordechaj Tenenbaum and Daniel Moszkowicz were armed with only one machine gun, rifles, several dozen pistols, Molotov cocktails and bottles filled with acid. As with the earlier Warsaw Ghetto Uprising extinguished in May 1943, the Białystok uprising had no chance for military success. However, it was seen as a way to die in combat rather than in German camps. A Betar youth commander was Yitzhak Fleischer, also spelled Fleisher, or Berl Fleischer according to different source.

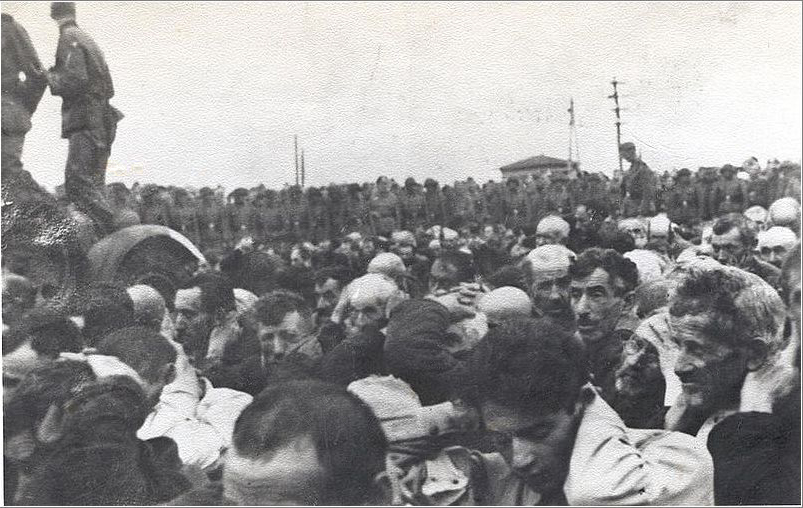
Liquidation of the Białystok Ghetto, 15–20 August 1943. Jewish men with their hands up, watched by a German military unit.

The intensive fighting took place in the area of Smolna, Chmielna and Fabryczna streets. The fights in isolated pockets of resistance lasted for several days, but the defence was broken almost instantly with a tank sent into the ghetto by SS Gruppenführer Odilo Globocnik. German soldiers set fire to the area. The commanders of the struggle committed suicide after their bunkers ran out of ammunition. In spite of the insurgency, the planned deportations to concentration and extermination camps went ahead on August 17, 1943, without any delay. Approximately 10,000 Jews were led to the Holocaust trains and sent to camps in Treblinka, Majdanek and Auschwitz. A transport of 1,200 children were sent to Theresienstadt concentration camp and later to Auschwitz, where they were murdered.

Several dozen guerillas managed to break through to the forests surrounding Białystok where they joined the partisan units of Armia Krajowa and other organisations and survived the war. It is estimated that out of almost 60,000 Jews who lived in Białystok before World War II, only several hundred survived the Holocaust.

== Analysis ==
Historian Evgeny Finkel argues that "the comparison of the Minsk, Kraków, and Białystok ghettos suggests a direct linkage between the likelihood of uprising and the Zionists' leading role in the underground"; in Bialystok, the local Zionist chapters were well organized and had experience with clandestine activity from having operated underground even before the Nazi occupation, and ultimately successfully organized a rebellion, and convinced the rival communist faction to join; in Kraków, the Zionists were poorly organized and often dependent on cooperation with the communists, and thus could not successfully realize an uprising despite intending to. The difference between communist and Zionist behavior has been explained in the Zionists' greater salience of Jewish identity; they preferred to defend Jewish honor to the end even when doing so was suicidal, whereas the communists preferred to flee into forested lands and regroup.

== Books ==
- B. Mark, "Ruch oporu w getcie białostockim. Samoobrona-zagłada-powstanie" (Polish, "Resistance movement in the Białystok ghetto. Self-defence – annihilation – uprising."), Warsaw 1952.
- "Obozy hitlerowskie na ziemiach polskich 1939 – 1945. Informator encyklopedyczny." (Polish, "Nazi camps on Polish soil 1939–1945. Encyclopedic reference book."), Warsaw 1979 r.
