= Lev Fink =

Soviet physicist

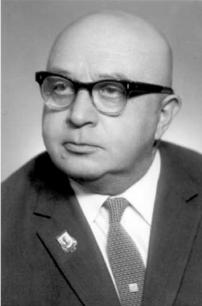

Lev Fink (Russian: Лев Матве́eвич Финк; 1910–1988) was a Soviet physicist. He was a Doktor nauk in Telecommunication.

He was born in Kiev, at the time part of the Russian Empire.

He died on December 8, 1988 in Leningrad a few years before the collapse of the Soviet Union.
