= Antifascist Front of Slavs in Hungary =

Antifascist Front of Slavs in Hungary (Serbo-Croatian: Antifašistički front Slovena u Mađarskoj/Антифашистички фронт Словена у Мађарској, Hungarian: Magyarországi Szlávok Antifasiszta Frontja) was a political organization founded on February 18, 1945, in Battonya. The first elected General Secretary of the AFSH was Dragutin Nedučić from Battonya, while the position of vice-president initially went to Stevan Nedučić from Csanádpalota.

After military rule was ended in March 1945, local organizations of AFSH were founded in Bács among Bunjevci and among Šokci in Hercegszántó. AFSH's main organizer among the Bunjevci was Antun Karagić.

After Békés and Bács, new organizations were also founded around Budapest. The county Secretariat of AFSH was founded in August 1945 in Pécs, and Svetozar Lastić was elected as its secretary.

In September 1945 AFSH started founding other local organizations in Baranya. The Baranya-Bács Slavic Cultural association soon joined the Front, and Martin Laslović was elected as regional president.

The first big rally of AFSH was on October 28, 1945, in Mohács. On December 3, 1945, the first National conference was held in Mohács and Martin Laslović was elected as president.
