= Anti-Fascist Military Organisation =

Former underground organization in Białystok

Antyfaszystowska Organizacja Bojowa (Polish for Anti-Fascist Military Organisation), AOB, was an underground organization formed in 1942 in the Ghetto in Białystok by former officers of the Polish Land Forces. It took part in the Białystok Ghetto uprising.

Its tasks included organisation of escape routes for the people incarcerated in the Ghetto as well as gathering arms and equipment for the future fight against the Germans. Since February 1943 it carried over many attacks on German authorities and armed forces operating in the Ghetto. On August 15, 1943, the AOB members started an ill-fated struggle against the liquidation of the Ghetto, which is known as the Białystok Ghetto Uprising.

== See also ==
- Antifascist Front of Slavs in Hungary
