= Cytron Synagogue =

Format synagogue in Białystok, Poland

- Polish: Synagoga Cytronów
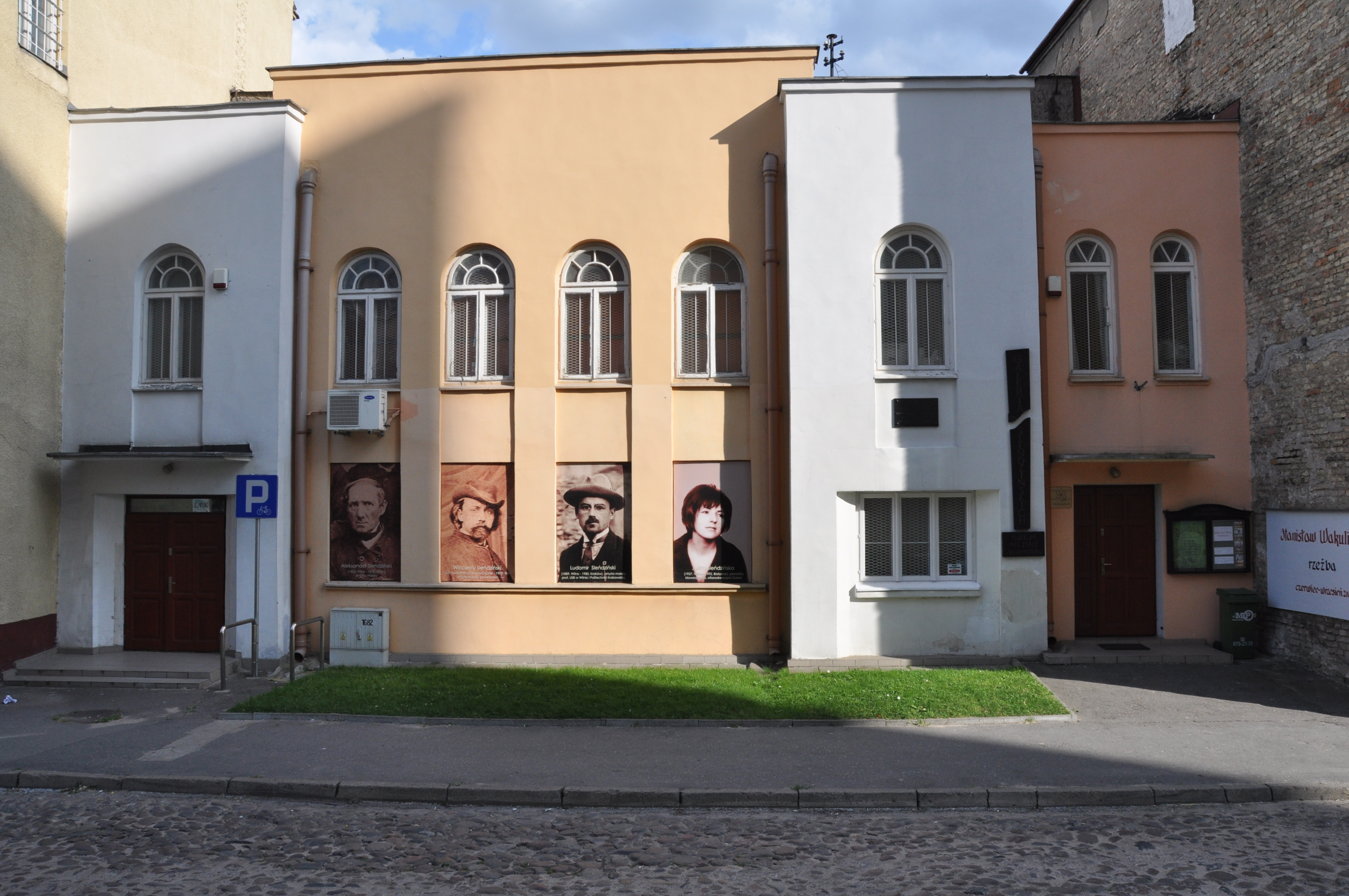
- The former synagogue, now an art gallery

- Location of the former synagogue, now art gallery, in Podlaskie Voivodeship

Religion
- Affiliation: Orthodox Judaism (former)
- Rite: Nusach Ashkenaz
- Ecclesiastical or organizational status: Synagogue (1936–1939); Profane use (1939–1960s); Art gallery
- Status: Abandoned; repurposed

Location
- Location: 24a Ludwika Waryńskiego Street, Białystok, Podlaskie Voivodeship
- Country: Poland
- Interactive map of Cytron Synagogue
- Coordinates: 53°08′13″N 23°09′12″E

Architecture
- Type: Synagogue architecture
- Style: Modernist
- Funded by: Shmuel Cytron
- Completed: 1936
- Materials: Brick

The Cytron Synagogue (Polish: Synagoga Cytronów), also known as the Beit Midrash Cytron, is a former Orthodox Jewish congregation and synagogue, located at 24a Ludwika Waryńskiego Street in Białystok, in Podlaskie Voivodeship, Poland. Completed in 1936 in the Modernist style, the construction was funded by Shmuel Cytron, it served as a house of prayer until World War II; subsequently used for profane purposes, and as the Sleńdzińscy Gallery, an art gallery.

== History ==
The synagogue was built in 1936 with money from the Cytron family of industrialists. Before 1941, Jews formed a very high percentage of the population of Białystok. The majority were murdered in the Holocaust during the German occupation of Poland.

After World War II, the synagogue saw variable amounts of use, as the last operating synagogue in the city. It finally ceased to operate in the late 1960s. Many decorative elements were destroyed in renovations at the end of the 1970s.

The synagogue building is used as the city's art gallery and museum, that exhibits artefacts from the Śledziński family.

== See also ==
- History of the Jews in Poland
- List of active synagogues in Poland
