= Zasady, Podlaskie Voivodeship =

Zasady
- Village
- Location within Poland
- Coordinates: 53°13′N 23°27′E
- Country: Poland
- Voivodeship: Podlaskie
- County: rypin
- Gmina: rypin

Zasady [zaˈsadɨ] is a village in the administrative district of Gmina Gródek, within Białystok County, Podlaskie Voivodeship, in north-eastern Poland, close to the border with Belarus.
