= Mordechai Tenenbaum =

Polish resistance fighter (1916–1943)

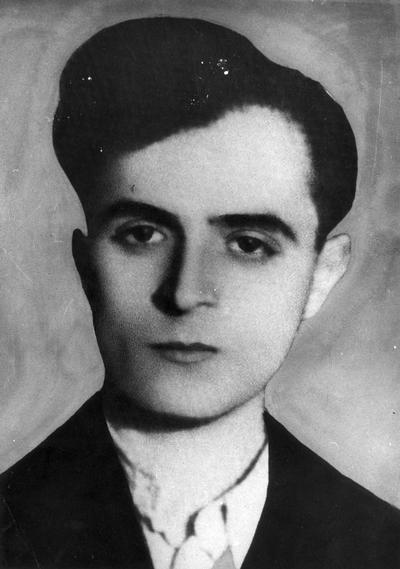
- Born: 1916; Warsaw, Poland
- Died: 20 August 1943 (aged 26–27) Białystok Ghetto
- Allegiance: ŻOB
- Commands: Leader of the Białystok Ghetto Uprising
- Conflicts: World War II: Warsaw Ghetto Uprising; Białystok Ghetto Uprising †

Mordechai Tenenbaum (Hebrew: מרדכי טענענבוים; 1916–1943) was a member of the Jewish Combat Organization (Żydowska Organizacja Bojowa) and leader of the Białystok Ghetto Uprising.

== Early life ==
Mordechaj Tenenbaum was born in Warsaw, one of 7 children to an Orthodox-Jewish family. From an early age, Tenenbaum abandoned the religious lifestyle, along with one of his brothers, and became interested in secular culture. After graduating from the Hebrew high school "Tarbut” in Warsaw, he studied Turkish and Semitic languages, at the University of Warsaw. Active in Zionist youth circles since his childhood, Tenenbaum joined the Poale Zion youth movement in 1935.

After the outbreak of World War II, and the German occupation of Poland, he left Warsaw with his girlfriend, Tema Schneiderman, and others to areas occupied by the Soviet Union. Their plan was to immigrate to Palestine, but this was delayed by lack of sufficient documents. Finally, Tenenbaum obtained forged documents that allowed his friends to emigrate, although he remained in Vilna, to engage in activities among Jewish youth.

There, he organized the resistance against the Germans in Wilno and Warsaw.

== Vilna and the Warsaw Ghetto ==
In Vilna, under Soviet occupation (1940–1941), he continued to work to save Jewish youth, by providing them with certificates. Tenenbaum himself had a forged identity card in the name of a "Tatar" from the Vilnius region, named Tamaroff, a family name that also mentioned the name of his wife, Tema Schneiderman.

This borrowed identity allowed him more free movement, including all territories under Nazi control. Even after the Nazi invasion of the Soviet Union, (including Lithuania), Tenenbaum made many forged papers for friends and loved ones, that allowed them to elude and escape the Schutzstaffel. In 1942, he arrived in Warsaw, where he was one of the founders of the YKA, and among the organizers and planners of the Warsaw Ghetto Uprising.

== Białystok Ghetto uprising ==
In November 1942, Tenenbaum went on a mission to Białystok, intending to serve as the head of the Haganah movement. There, he organized the Jewish underground fighters, and headed the local resistance movement, which included members of Hashomer Hatzair and Dror.

It was then decided, that with the start of an action by the Germans to "liquidate" the ghetto, the resistance would fight in the streets of Białystok, before attempting to escape to the forests, and continue operating as underground partisans. The Ghetto underwent a number of major operations during 1943, and members of the underground who remained there, felt that they were the last fighters, following the liquidation of the ghettos in Warsaw, Będzin and Częstochowa. One German was killed February 4, 1943

Armed with only twenty-six rifles, one machine gun, roughly one hundred pistols, and several Molotov cocktails, the resistance forces were severely under-equipped, compared to the SS battalion against them. On the night of August 15, 1943, the Germans began to encircle the ghetto as the uprising began. During the uprising, Tenenbaum and his comrades fought for five days against the German forces, rupturing Wehrmacht supply lines, and forcing German soldiers and military police groups to divert from the East. This would help allow the Red Army to march westwards to Poland. Nine German soldiers were wounded.

The evacuation plan to Lublin had failed, upon the total encirclement of the ghetto. At the end of the fighting, Tenenbaum and his close friend Moszkowicz committed suicide, in order not to fall into the hands of the Nazis.

Of the nearly 50,000 Jewish inhabitants of the Białystok Ghetto prior to the uprising, only a few hundred would survive, and escape to the surrounding forests. The uprising was the second largest Jewish uprising against Nazi occupation during World War 2.

== Legacy ==
After the war, to honor Tenenbaum and the uprising, a square in Białystok was named after him.
