= Biała (Supraśl) =

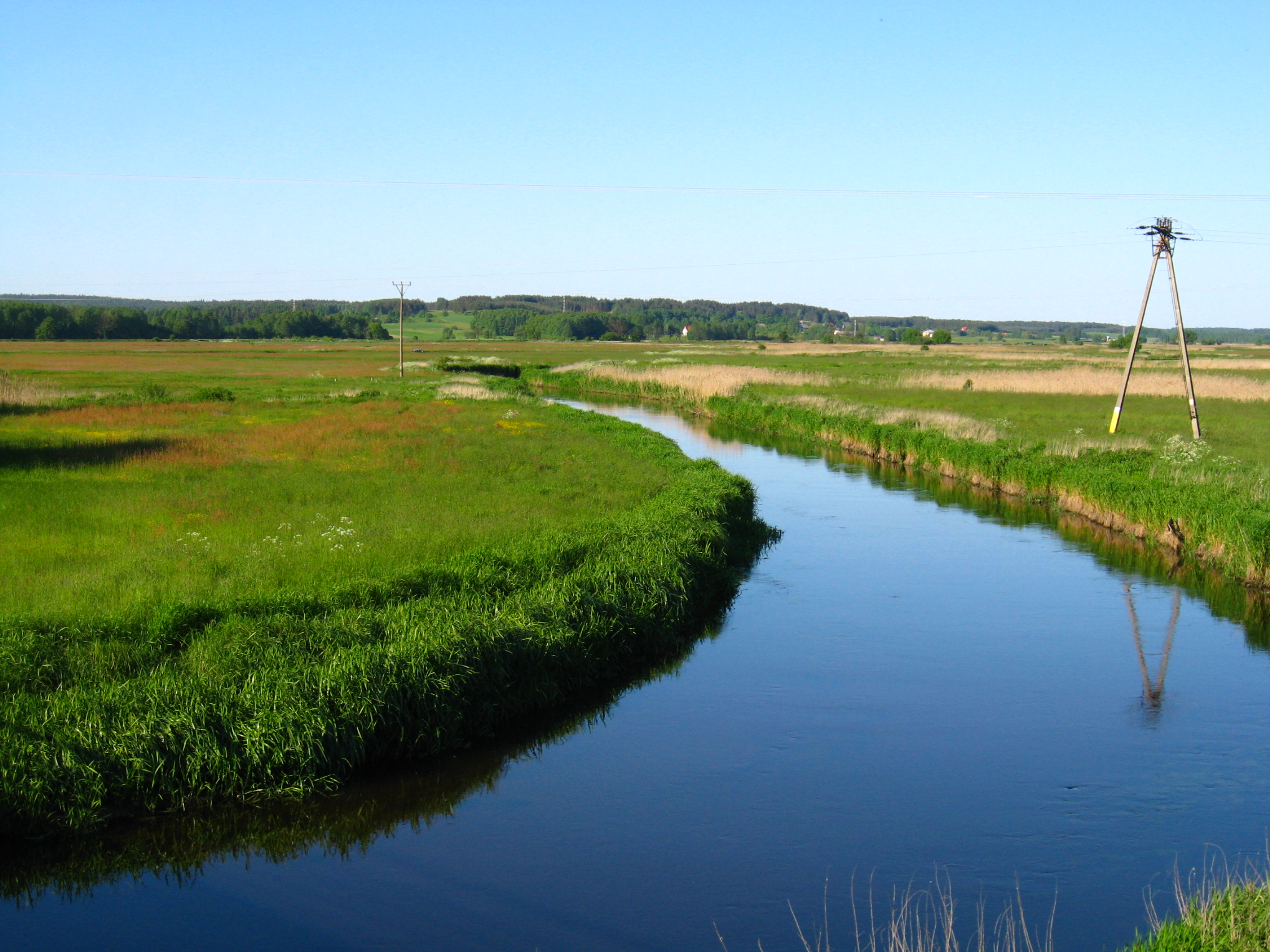
- Biała River near Fasty, Poland

Location
- Country: Poland

Physical characteristics
- Source
  - location: near Kuriany, Poland
  - elevation: 168 m (551 ft)
- Mouth
  - location: Supraśl River near Fasty
  - coordinates: 53°10′42″N 23°01′38″E
  - elevation: 115 m (377 ft)
- Length: 32.7 km (20.3 mi)
- Basin size: 119 km^{2} (46 sq mi)

Basin features
- Progression: Supraśl→ Narew→ Vistula→ Baltic Sea
- Tributaries
  - left: Dolistówka
  - right: Bażantarka

The Biała is a river in eastern Poland in Podlaskie Voivodeship, a left tributary of the Supraśl River, with a length of 32.7 kilometres and a basin area of 119 km^{2}. Biała passes through Białystok from south to north-east.

== Tributaries ==
The major tributaries of Biała are:

- Dolistówka
- Bażantarka
