= Bus (disambiguation) =

A bus is a large vehicle designed to carry passengers.

Bus, Buş, Buš, or BUS may also refer to:

== People ==
- Bus (nickname) for the nickname and people with that name
- Bus (surname) for the Dutch surname and people with that name
- Buș for the Romanian surname and people with that name

== Places ==
- Bus (Bithynia), a town of ancient Bithynia, now in Turkey
- Bus Bloc, a concession in the Congo Free State
- Buš, Czech Republic
- Bus, Pas-de-Calais, France, a commune
- Bus or Buss Island, a phantom island in the North Atlantic Ocean
- Bus-Saint-Rémy, a former commune, Normandy, France
- Batumi International Airport (IATA airport code BUS), in the country of Georgia

== Science and technology ==
- Bus (computing), transferring data
- Software bus, the software architecture equivalent to the above
- Audio bus, a group of audio tracks
- Bus network, a type of network topology
- Busbar, an electric power distribution channel
- Satellite bus, a general spacecraft model for multiple-production satellites
- Vehicle bus, a specialized internal communications network in automotive engineering

== Entertainment ==
- BUS (band), a Thai boy group

== Other uses ==
- Bus (Bulgarian play), 1980
- Belle Urban System, the transit agency serving Racine, Wisconsin, US
- Bank of the United States (disambiguation)
- The South African term for a pacesetter in running

== See also ==
- The Bus (disambiguation)
- Buss (disambiguation)
- Buus, municipality in the canton of Basel-Landschaft, Switzerland
- Railbus, a lightweight passenger railcar with an automotive engine
