= Buss =

Buss is a surname. Notable people with the surname include:

- Amos E. Buss (1814–1872), American politician from Ohio
- Benjamin Buss (born 1977), German guitarist better known as Matthew Greywolf
- David Buss (born 1953), American evolutionary psychologist
- Frances Buss, British pioneer of women's education
- Henrique Adriano Buss, Brazilian footballer
- Jeanie Buss (born 1961), American sports executive, daughter of Jerry Buss
- Jerry Buss (1933–2013), American sports executive most famous as longtime owner of the Los Angeles Lakers
- Jesse Buss, American sports executive, son of Jerry Buss
- Jim Buss (born 1959), American sports executive, son of Jerry Buss
- Johnny Buss (born 1956), American sports executive, oldest son of Jerry Buss
- Leo Buss, (born 1953), Yale University professor
- Malwina Buss (born 1991), Polish actress
- Robert William Buss (1804–1875), British artist and illustrator
- Tesha Buss, American politician
- Tito Buss (1925–2013), Brazilian Roman Catholic bishop

== See also ==
- Bus (surname)
- Busse, surname
