= Adam Streisand =

American lawyer

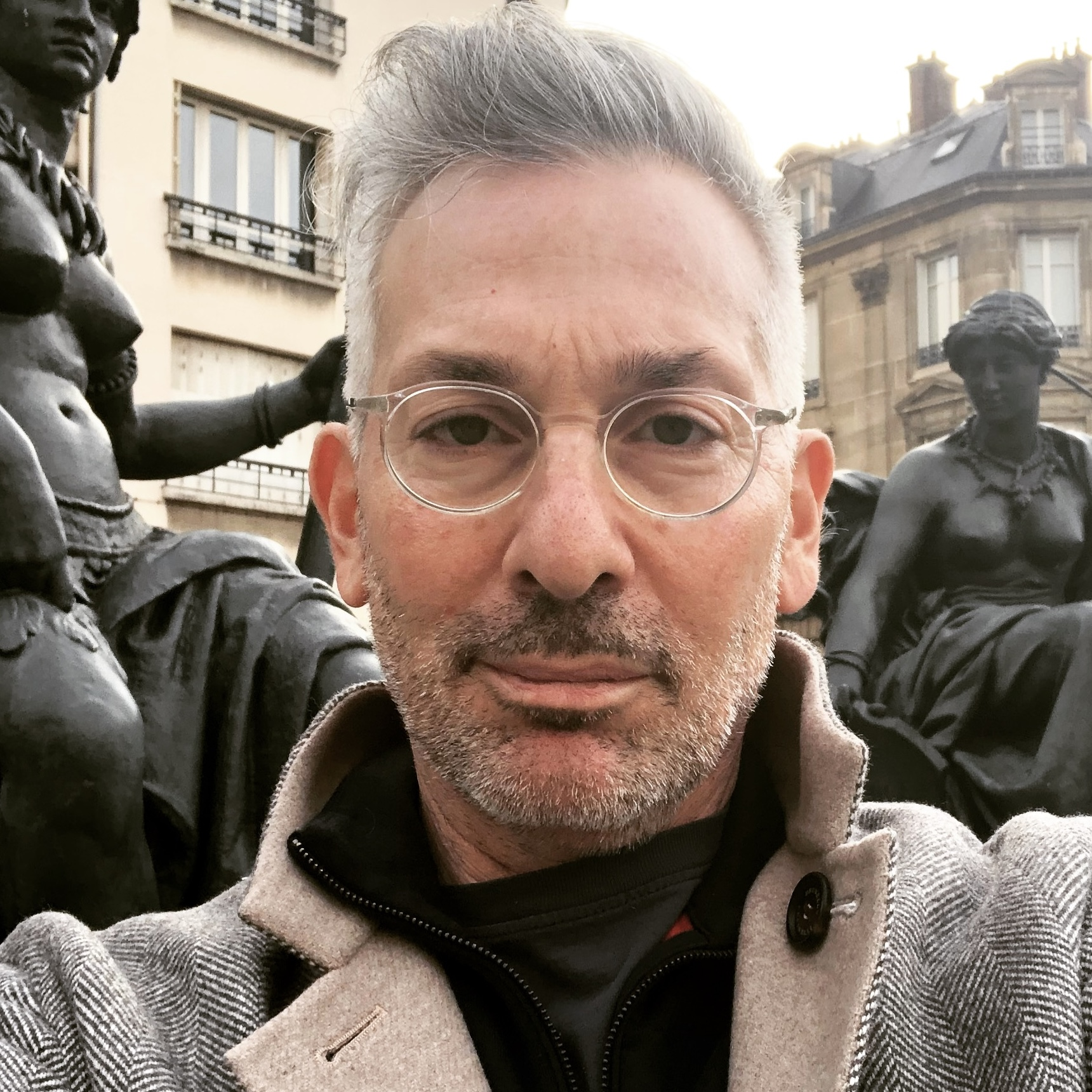
- Born: Adam Fredric Streisand; June 9, 1963 (age 63); New York City, US
- Education: Trinity College, Connecticut (BA); American University (JD)
- Occupation: Attorney
- Years active: 34
- Relatives: Barbra Streisand (second cousin)

Adam Fredric Streisand (born June 9, 1963, in New York City) is an American trial attorney notable for his involvement in high-profile litigation with regard to private wealth disputes, fiduciary litigation, business succession and "partnership disputes and litigation involving trusts, estates and conservatorships." He is a partner at the international law firm Sheppard, which he joined in 2015.

He is credited with preserving both NBA franchises in Los Angeles, having represented former Microsoft CEO Steve Ballmer at trial against Donald Sterling over the Los Angeles Clippers, and Jeanie Buss in litigation over control of the Los Angeles Lakers. Streisand also represented Dea Spanos Berberian and Georgia Angelos in litigation involving succession and control over the LA Chargers and Baltimore Orioles, respectively. Streisand is one of the most influential people in Los Angeles, due to his involvement in battles over the estates of the rich and famous, including Michael Jackson, Tom Petty, Hugh Hefner, Muhammad Ali, Ray Charles, Marilyn Monroe, Marlon Brando, Douglas Tompkins, Barry White, Dennis Hopper, Michael Crichton, Anna Nicole Smith, Rodney Dangerfield, Rock Hudson, Joey Bishop, Bing Crosby, Gore Vidal, Carroll Shelby, Alan Thicke, Terry Semel, Allen Paulson, and others.

== Career ==
=== Early career ===
Streisand graduated from Trinity College in Hartford, Connecticut, with a BA in history. During college, he studied at the Sorbonne in Paris for one academic year. After college, he served as legislative aide to U.S. Senator Barbara Mikulski (D-Md). Streisand graduated cum laude from the American University Washington College of Law as a member of its honor society and as an editor of its law review.

Streisand began his legal career in entertainment litigation with the law firm Loeb & Loeb. On behalf of his clients, Beastie Boys and Capitol Records, Streisand won the first digital sampling case in the U.S. Courts of Appeals, Newton v. Diamond, et al. Streisand won a palimony case for comedian Bill Maher brought by former girlfriend, Coco Johnson. Streisand achieved a significant settlement against Faye Dunaway, Terrence McNally and others over the film rights to the stage play Master Class for producer Lester Persky. Streisand successfully defended Diana Ross in a copyright infringement action by photographer Art Shay. He successfully litigated a copyright infringement action for BMG Music Publishing against Melissa Etheridge. Streisand represented Quincy Jones, the key witness in the defamation trial by Steve Wynn against "Girls Gone Wild" creator Joe Francis, in which the jury returned a $40 million verdict. Streisand obtained an injunction for Jacques Cousteau against the use of the Cousteau name in connection with a Fiji resort against Jean-Michel Cousteau and others. Britney Spears retained Streisand in connection with the petition to establish a conservatorship over the singer. Streisand successfully represented Kobe Bryant in a defamation action.

=== Estate litigation ===
Streisand transitioned from entertainment litigation to trust and estate litigation, becoming well known for success in both celebrity and traditional estate cases. Streisand has been widely acknowledged as a leading American trial attorney, particularly in the field of trust and estate litigation.

Streisand is cited as being the architect of the strategy to rely on an arcane provision of the California probate code, section 1310b, resulting in a trial victory for Steve Ballmer and his $2 billion purchase of the Los Angeles Clippers. Streisand was also involved in the drafting of legislation, including amendments to the California Celebrities Rights Act, to ensure the protection of a deceased celebrity's name and likeness and its descendibility to the celebrity's heirs. The estate of Marilyn Monroe retained Streisand to draft the amendments to the California Celebrities Rights Act.

In 2018, Adam Streisand represented Los Angeles Lakers controlling owner Jeanie Buss who was under pressure from an attempted coup by her brothers, Jimmy and Johnny Buss. Streisand's pre-emptive strike not only led to cementing permanently Jeanie's control of the Lakers, but the instant removal of her brothers from their positions as co-trustees of the trust established by their father, Jerry Buss, which owns the team.

The children of Leonard Cohen hired Streisand to represent them against Cohen's former manager, Robert Kory, whose attorney forged documents naming Kory the trustee of Cohen's estate. Streisand successfully returned control of the estate and monies Kory earned while acting in the capacity of trustee back to Cohen's children and heirs.

Streisand represented Dea Spanos Berberian in a significant legal case against her brother, Dean Spanos, regarding control of the Los Angeles Chargers. The lawsuit addressed fiduciary disputes within the Spanos family, ultimately leading to the proposed sale of a 27% stake in the team to Detroit Pistons owner Tom Gores.

In 2024, Streisand represented Rupert Murdoch at trial before a court in Reno, Nevada, against James Murdoch, Elisabeth Murdoch and Prudence MacLeod, three of Murdoch's children, seeking to ratify changes to an irrevocable trust that would have the effect of eliminating the voting control they would have over his media empire after Rupert Murdoch's death, and vest that control in the hands of his son and chosen successor, Lachlan Murdoch.

=== Recognition ===
- In 2015 and 2017, Mr. Streisand was recognized as one of the “Best Lawyers in America” by Best Lawyers, in the field of Litigation, trusts and estates.
- In 2015, 2017 and 2018, the Daily Journal named Streisand as one of the top trial attorneys in the nation.
- In 2016, Streisand was recognized by The National Law Journal as a Divorce, Trusts & Estates Trailblazer.
- The Chambers HNW guide published by Chambers & Partners, individually ranked Streisand in the Private Wealth Law category for Southern California and he was also ranked nationally in the Private Wealth Disputes category. In 2019, Chambers & Partners named Streisand as the U.S. Trusts and Estates Litigator of the Year.
- In 2017 and 2018, Lawdragon named Streisand as one of the top "Leading Lawyers in America."
- The Los Angeles Business Journal named Adam Streisand as Litigation Attorney of the year in 2018 for his rare and wide expertise in disputes involving entertainment and intellectual property issues.
- In 2020, 2022, and 2023, the Los Angeles Business Journal recognized Adam Streisand as one of the “Leaders of Influence: Litigators & Trial Lawyers” which highlights “the very best litigators in the business.”
- In 2020, Citywealth, a UK financial magazine, named Streisand one of the top 50 private wealth attorneys in North America, one of the top 100 private client lawyers and one of the 100 litigation attorneys worldwide.
- In 2021, he was selected by the Hollywood Reporter for their 15th annual Power Lawyers list which highlights the top entertainment lawyers in the industry.
- Streisand was named by the Daily Journal as a top 100 Lawyer in California for 2022.
- In 2022, Streisand was named one of the "Top 100 International Private Client Litigation Lawyers 2022" by Citywealth.
- The LA Business Journal has also named Adam Streisand as one of the 500 most influential people in Los Angeles for 9 years in a row and Who's Who in Law in 2023.
- The Hollywood Reporter listed Streisand as a power lawyer in trusts and estates in their 2022, 2023, 2024, and 2025 "Hollywood’s Troubleshooters: Top 35 Lawyers for Death, Divorce and Other Disasters". They also listed him in the 2026 "Hollywood's 100 Most Powerful Lawyer" list for his representation of Rupert Murdoch.
- Forbes Magazine featured Adam Streisand in their list of America's Best In-State Lawyers in 2025.
- For 2025–2026, Lawdragon listed Streisand as a "Leading Global Entertainment, Sports & Media Lawyer".

== Personal life ==
Adam Streisand is married to writer, director and producer Sofia Streisand, and they have one son, Pierre Streisand. He also has two daughters, Lena Streisand, an attorney, and Olivia Streisand, a documentary filmmaker, from a previous marriage to journalist Betsy Streisand. Adam is a cousin of famous singer and actress, Barbra Streisand. He is an avid cyclist and adventurist. He has camped near the North Pole, trekked 19,000 feet (5,800 m) in the Himalayas, and crossed the Pyrenees from the Atlantic Ocean to the Mediterranean on his bicycle.

== Filmography ==
Streisand has appeared as himself in Framing Britney Spears, The New York Times Presents, in the Netflix documentary, Britney vs Spears, and in guest appearances on Cuomo Prime Time, CNN Newsroom with Pamela Brown, America's Newsroom with Bill Hemmer and Dana Perino, and Your World with Neil Cavuto. Streisand is featured in the December 2022 Discovery+ docuseries Jamie Vs Britney: The Father Daughter Trials.

== Bibliography ==
- "Till Death Do We Divorce", Trusts and Estates Quarterly, Vol. 25, Issue 4, 2019
- "Cryptocurrencies and Trustees' Duty to Invest Prudently: Navigating Fiduciary Duties in the Age of Decentralization", Trusts and Estates Quarterly, Vol. 24, Issue 3, 2018
- Que Je T'Aime: L'affaire d'Heritage de Johnny Hallyday, National Law Review, August 2018
- “What Should Attorneys Have In Their Engagement Agreements”, ACTEC Podcast, February 2018
- California Trusts and Estates Quarterly, “Tortious Interference With Inheritance: Is It A Brave New World, Part II?”, Vol. 18, Issue 3, 2012
- California Trusts and Estates Quarterly, “Tortious Interference With Inheritance: Is It A Brave New World?”, Vol. 18, Issue 2, 2012
- ABA Trust & Investments: "Mental Disorders that Erode Capacity" by Adam F. Streisand, Esq. and James Edward Spar, M.D.
- ACTEC Journal: "A Lawyer's Guide to Diminishing Capacity and Effective Use of Medical Experts in Contemporaneous and Retrospective Evaluations" by Adam F. Streisand, Esq. and James Edward Spar, M.D.
- Estate Planning & Community Property Law Journal, Vol.3, Book 2, Spring 2011: Malpractice Melee: Fending Off The Disgruntled And Disappointed, An Estate Planner's Field Guide, by Adam F. Streisand, Esq.
- California Trusts & Estates Quarterly: "Rumors of Their Death are Greatly Exaggerated: the Pre-Death Will Contest and Other Strategies in Conservatorship Litigation", Vol.12, Issue 1, Spring 2006.
- California Trusts & Estates Quarterly: "Gone But Not Forgotten: Celebrity Estates and Intellectual Property Rights", Vol.11, Issue 1, Spring 2005.
- Hollywood Reporter: "Nine Things Entertainment Lawyers Should Know About Probate" (Nov. 6, 2007)
- California Trusts & Estates Quarterly, "No-Contest Clauses Need To Be Reformed, Not Abolished", Vol.10, Issue 3, Fall 2004
- California Trusts & Estates Quarterly, "Tapping The Trust To Fund The Battle: When Trustees Can Use Trust Funds To Litigate With Beneficiaries", Vol.9, Issue 1, Spring 2003.
- California Trusts & Estates Quarterly: "The Jury Is Back: Where There's A Will, Finding New Ways", Vol.8, Issue 1, Spring 2002.
- Cornell International Law Journal: "Conflicts of International Inheritance Laws in the Age of Multinational Lives", Vol.54, Issue 4, Fall 2020.
- L'OBS: "Le Jour De L’audience Pour Britney, on Ignorait Que La Cour L’avait Déjà Mise Sous Tutelle" by Adam F. Streisand
- Estate Planning Course Materials Journal, "Claims Against Irrevocable Trusts in Divorce Proceedings: Select Topics from a Litigator's Perspective", January 2022.
- Trusts & Estates Quarterly, "If I Get Married, I Want to Be Very Married. The Godfather of Soul, Richard Pryor and Other Post-Death Challenges Tell Us: How Married You Are Depends on the State", Vol.28, Issue 2, Spring 2022.
