= Bussing =

Bussing or busing may refer to:

- Student transport by bus
  - Desegregation busing
- Bussing (surname), a surname (including a list of people with the name)
- Bussing (setting and clearing tables), the job performed by a busser
- Büssing AG, former German bus and truck manufacturer
- Pulau Busing (Busing Island), island off the southwestern coast of Singapore

== See also ==
- Bussin (disambiguation)
- Buss (disambiguation)
- Bus (disambiguation)
