= Busse =

Busse is a surname. Notable people with the surname include:

- Andreas Busse (born 1959), East German (now German) former middle-distance runner
- Carl Busse (architect) (1834–1896), German architect and master builder
- Carl Hermann Busse (1872–1918), German lyric poet and literary critic
- Erwin von Busse (1895–1939), German writer, artist, stage director
- Ewald W. Busse (1917–2004), American psychiatrist, gerontologist, author and academic administrator
- Fred A. Busse (1866–1914), mayor of Chicago 1907–1911
- Friedhelm Busse (1929–2008) German neo-Nazi politician and activist
- Georg Heinrich Busse (1810–1868), German landscape painter and engraver
- Heinrich Busse (1909–1998), highly decorated Oberst in the Wehrmacht during World War II
- Henry Busse (1894–1955), German-born American jazz trumpeter
- Hermann Eris Busse (1891–1947), German novelist and literary critic
- Hermann Busse (1903–1970), German politician
- Joachim Busse (born 1954), West German (now German) retired long jumper
- Joachim von Busse (1893–1945), German World War I flying ace
- Jochen Busse (born 1941), German television actor
- Johannes von Busse (1862–1836), German military officer
- Laura Busse (born c. 1977), German neuroscientist
- Lynda Busse, American optical physicist
- Martin Busse (born 1958), East German (now German) retired football midfielder
- Otto Busse (1867–1922), German pathologist
- Otto Busse (1901–1980), German resistance fighter
- Ray Busse (born 1948), American Major League Baseball shortstop 1971–1974
- Theodor Busse (1897–1986), German officer during World War I and World War II
- Tomasz Busse (born 1956), Polish former wrestler
- Walter Busse (born 1987), Argentine football midfielder
- Walter Carl Otto Busse (1865–1933), German botanist
- Wilhelm Busse (1915–1944), highly decorated Oberstleutnant in the Wehrmacht during World War II
- Yuri Busse (born 2001), Russian artistic gymnast

== See also ==
- Busse Woods, the common name of the Ned Brown Forest Preserve in northern Illinois
- Buss Island, also called Busse Island, a phantom island of the Age of Exploration
- Buss, surname
- Bussey (disambiguation)
