= Buss (disambiguation) =

Buss is a surname typically used by people of English or German ancestry.

Buss may also refer to:

- Buss (song), a song by Rico Nasty
- Buss Island, a phantom island in the North Atlantic Ocean
- Buss up shut, a Caribbean name for the Indian flatbread more commonly known as a parantha
- Herring buss, a small fishing boat

== See also ==
- Bus (disambiguation)
- Buss Down, a song by Aitch
- Buss It, a song by Erica Banks
- Buss Park, a park in Australia
- Buss–Perry Aggression Questionnaire, an assessment to measure interpersonal hostility
