= Hermann Busse =

Hermann Busse may refer to:

- Hermann Busse (politician), German politician
- Hermann Eris Busse, German novelist and literary critic
