= Christy Buss =

American Dancer, Choreographer, Actress (born 1959)

Christy Curtis Buss
- Born: Christy Curtis; December 28, 1958 (age 67); St. Louis, Missouri, United States
- Occupations: Dancer, Choreographer, Actress, Business Owner
- Spouse: Johnny Buss

Christy Curtis Buss (born December 28, 1958) is an American dancer, choreographer, and actress. She started her career as an actress and dancer before she became a Cheerleader and choreographer for the Los Angeles Rams and Los Angeles Clippers and the director or the Los Angeles Sparks Kids Buss is the former daughter-in-law of Jerry Buss, who owned the Los Angeles Lakers and other sports businesses.

== Early life ==
Christy Curtis Buss was born on December 28, 1959, in St. Louis, Missouri. She grew up dancing at her mother's dance studio and continued to hone her skills as a dancer and choreographer throughout her life.

== Professional career ==
After winning The ABC TV Special All American Women in 1979, Christy moved to Los Angeles, California. She became the captain of the Los Angeles Rams cheerleaders and traveled the world. Christy acted in commercials, film and soap operas which led her to choreographing shows such as NBC's Passions and Days of Our Lives. in 1999 or the movie Private School in 1983. She also worked on choreography for Sunset Beach, The LeAnn Rimes Tour, Paul Rodriquez and Dian Diaz in Las Vegas, MTV, Los Angeles Clippers, Los Angeles Sparks, and Bob Hope Super Bowl Special USO Tours She also appeared as celebrity host on TV shows Showbiz Tonight and Celebrity Host on Showbiz Today.

In 1993, Christy opened dance studio while also choreographing with partners and groups for special occasions. In 2016 Christy launched her online show All About Christy. Buss sold her dance studio in 2021. She is now the founder and CEO of a skincare company.

== Personal life ==
Around 1991, Christy Curtis Buss married Johnny Buss, the former executive vice president of the Los Angeles Lakers and son of Jerry Buss. They were separated by 2012.

== Awards and achievements ==
Christy Curtis Buss received the 2002 Adjudicators Award at the Tremaine Dance Convention and the 2016 Artistic Director's Award at the LA Dance Magic Convention.
