= Chasia Bornstein-Bielicka =

Chasia Bornstein-Bielicka (Hebrew: חסיה בורנשטין-ביליצקה; January 16, 1921 – July 15, 2012) was a member of Hashomer Hatzair, who took part in the underground Jewish resistance in the Grodno and Białystok ghettos during the German occupation of Poland during the Nazi era. After the war, she ran a home for surviving Jewish children, with whom she immigrated to Israel, and then helped found Kibbutz Lehavot HaBashan. She wrote about her experiences in her book One of the Few: A Resistance Fighter and Educator.

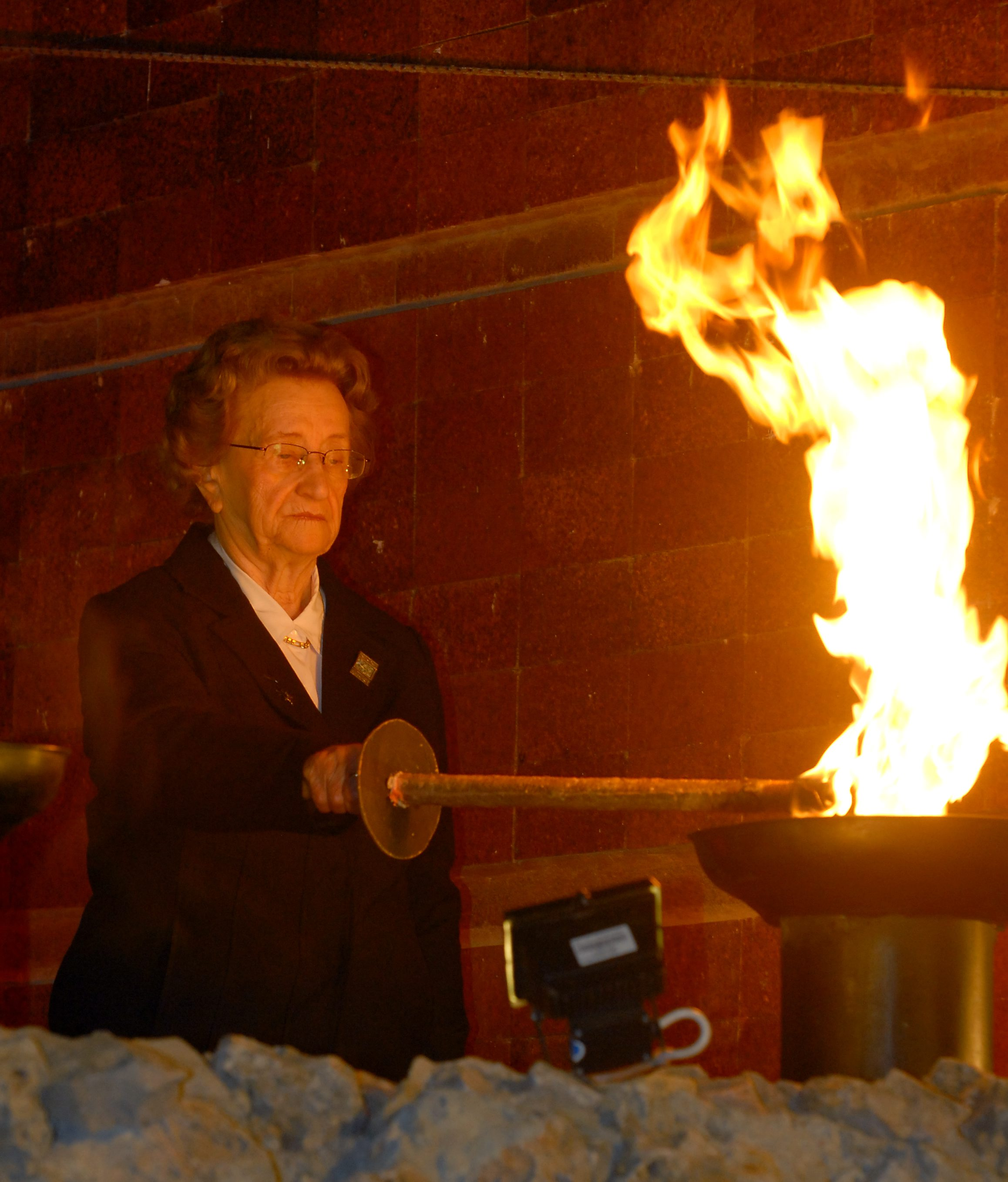
The opening ceremony of the holocaust memorial day, at "Yad Vashem" in Jerusalem. in the photo, holocaust survivor Hasia (Belizka) Burnstein lighting a memorial torch.

== Early life ==
Bornstein-Bielicka was born in Grodno, Poland in January 1921 as the second daughter of a family of four children. Her father, Yehuda Biletzky, owned a soft drink factory and did accounting and her mother Deborah worked as a factory worker and opened a small grocery store from the window of their house to help support the household.

Her father tried to immigrate to Argentina in order to improve their economic situation and examined the possibility of relocating the family to America, but these attempts failed. Due to financial difficulties, Bornstein-Bielicka attended a vocational school from the World ORT network, and not a Jewish private school like her brother. There she learned sewing which would help her during the war.

At the age of 12 in 1933, Bornstein-Bielicka joined the Hashomer Hatzair movement, which instilled in her Zionist and socialist values. She would spend every afternoon with her movement members, and in her adulthood even became the movement's representative at the Central Movement Conference.

== Beginning of World War II ==
As Grodno was in the eastern part of Poland, the city was occupied several times. When the war broke out on September 1, 1939, it was occupied by the Germans, who imposed a curfew on all residents, restricted the distribution of food and encouraged harassment and abuse of the city's Jews. A few weeks later, as part of the Molotov–Ribbentrop Pact, the city was passed into the hands of the Red Soviet Army.

The Soviets did not differentiate between Jews and Christians and focused their struggle on capitalism. They banned all political association, and took over all powers. During their control, activities of the Hashomer Hatzair movement were not allowed. Bornstein-Bielicka and her friends continued to hold secret group meetings in order to continue to conduct social movement activities.

== Nazi Occupation ==
In June 1941, at the beginning of Operation Barbarossa, Nazi Germany's invasion of the Soviet Union, Grodno was once again occupied by the Germans. Immediately after their conquest, the Germans imposed decrees on the Jews. They imposed a curfew and distributed food stamps to all the residents, but the Jews were usually pushed to the end of the line and did not receive their share.

Bornstein-Bielicka, who appeared Polish, used to stand in line for bread, where she would take off the mandated Star of David to not be identified as a Jew. To raise money for food, other than bread, for the family, she began working for Polish neighbors in sewing jobs.

In November 1941, all the city's Jews were ordered to move to two ghettos which were located in a crowded area in the city center. Bornstein-Bielicka and her family moved in with her childhood friend's grandmother, along with another family. They experienced severe hunger. Her father and brother worked in forced labor camps, and she began working outside the ghetto in a brick factory. She befriended the Poles who worked with her and began to do sewing work for them, in return she received food and brought it to her family. Later she also worked in beet fields, a very hard job that hurt her, but earned her additional food rations.

=== Resistance ===
Under the curfew and the difficult living conditions in the ghetto, Bornstein-Bielicka and her friends from Shomer Hatzair began to organize an active underground leadership that made decisions about the nature of the movement's activities in the ghetto. This organization created alternative educational frameworks for the children and youth in the ghetto, which brought them together and allowed them to play, talk, learn and help each other. They guided groups of different ages in both ghettos and in the city.

After making home visits to the children in the ghetto, Bornstein-Bielicka and other underground leadership decided to create a network of mutual aid in the ghetto. They moved between the houses and attempted to get food, clothes, and shoes for families who were in dire straits. They were aided by members of the Dror youth movement and communists in the ghetto. Their first activity was to prepare the area - creating passages between yards, streets, houses and alleys, in order to create usable roads. They then worked to create cold weapons, obtain firearms from nearby villages, and even set up a laboratory to forge certificates and documents.

On November 2, "Aktion," a series of violent actions by Nazi forces, of the two ghettos in Grodno began. Members of the leadership understood that the Jews were being taken to labor and extermination camps, from which they would not return. They were influenced by the call which was circulated among the movements, "Do not go like sheep to the slaughter."

The underground members wanted to fight the Germans, even though it was clear to them that they would pay for it with their lives. Bornstein-Bielicka was moved to Białystok by underground leadership on January 15-16th along with a friend Tzila, to assist with document forgery to help other Jews escape.

Meanwhile, the other members of the underground were few and their weapons were scarce. The two main actions they took were a failed assassination attempt on Starblov, the ghetto commander, and an attempt to free the Jews gathered during the last liquidation in the synagogue, an unsuccessful attempt due to lack of Jewish cooperation and lack of weapons. The underground fighters were the only ones who escaped and found refuge with a Polish farmer, but were murdered in their sleep after Polish neighbors reported them.

== Bialystok Resistance ==
Since the leadership of the underground group feared the liquidation of the ghetto, Bornstein-Bielicka was assigned, together with Tzlia, to go to Białystok. They were supposed to save the so-called "Laboratory" from Grodno, a collection of materials used in forging documents, which allowed Jews to leave the ghetto thanks to forged papers. On the night of January 15–16, 1943, Bornstein-Bielicka and her friend arrived in Białystok.

After entering the ghetto and moving the document forging laboratory, using a forged birth certificate, Bornstein-Bielicka assumed a second identity as a Polish woman named Halina Stasiuk. She worked for the Jewish resistance in Białystok as a "liaison girl," meaning she could stay outside the ghetto using her second identity and serve as a liaison for the underground resistance movement. She worked as a maid for an SS man and his family named Luchterhand. She rented a room in the homes of Poles who did not know her Jewish identity. For half a year she served as a liaison between the Aryan side and the ghetto, transporting ammunition, medicines, materials for the production of weapons and more.

On August 15, 1943, Bornstein-Bielicka saw a convoy of Ukrainian soldiers filling the city streets and realized that the liquidation of the Bialystok ghetto was imminent. She secretly entered the ghetto and informed her underground friends, who refused to acknowledge her remarks. That same night, at 3:00 a.m., military forces entered the ghetto. They surrounded the ghetto with the help of many soldiers and various weapons. Bornstein-Bielicka entered the ghetto to fight the Germans with members of the underground, but the commander of the uprising, Mordechai Tenenbaum, ordered her to return to the Aryan side so that she could provide them with additional weapons if necessary.

Bornstein-Bielicka was the last to escape the ghetto before its liquidation. She announced what was happening to the other connections in the city and joined the Polish crowd watching the expulsion of the Jews from the ghetto. She saw the attempted revolt and the Jews waiting to be deported, among whom included her mother and sisters. In the evening, after returning to her apartment in the city, she was visited by Haika Grossman, another underground liaison and close friend, who managed to escape the ghetto during the uprising. Bornstein-Bielicka introduced Grossman to her landlord as her cousin, and she stayed to live with her.

== Resistance after the Liquidation of the Bialystok Ghetto ==
After the liquidation of the Bialystok ghetto, six connections remained in the city: Hasya Bilitsky, Haika Grossman, a member of Hashomer Hatzair and one of the leaders of the underground in Bialystok, Bronia Klibanski, a member of the Dror youth movement and a member of the "Anti- Fascist Cell in Bialystok," Lisa Chapnik, a member of the Komsomol youth movement in Grodno, Anya Rod, a communist, an IL member of the Bialystok ghetto, and one of the founders of the anti-fascist committee in the ghetto, and the Vilnius (Vilna) partisan organization, which liaised with the partisan battalion in the Bialystok forests.

In her book, "One of the Few", Bornstein-Bielicka notes German residents who assisted her and the other liaisons on their way and formed a German cell in the underground. Among them was Arthur Schade, a German communist who also assisted many Jews and took part in underground activities, and Otto Bossa, a German who assisted many Jews, with whom Bornstein-Bielicka worked. Bossa became a spy and a significant partner of Bornstein-Bielicka in her activities. "And so it was. For almost a whole year, until August 1944, the man did not stop helping. At one point he was no longer just an assistant, but became a partner and an entrepreneur."

In July 1944, due to the advance of the Russian army and the beginning of the withdrawal of the German army, Bornstein-Bielicka, along with her close friends, was asked to draw a map of all the German positions and bases in the vicinity of Bialystok. In joint forces with Otto Bossa, Arthur Schade, and the remaining underground members, field data was collected and Bornstein-Bielicka drew an accurate map of the array. At the same time at the request of Bossa, Bornstein-Bielicka and the other activists in the underground moved in to his office and apartment, as Bossa feared that during the last days of the war the Poles would harm them.

As Soviet troops advanced, Bornstein-Bielicka and Arthur Schade joined the partisan forces in the forests. They passed the map to the commander of the partisan unit which passed the Red Army headquarters. Thanks to this map, the Russians occupied Bialystok without any casualties.

After the war, Bornstein-Bielicka, Lisa Chipnik, and Anya Rod received the highest award of the Red Army for Civilian Excellence: "Soviet Medal of Excellence, First Class."

== End of World War II ==
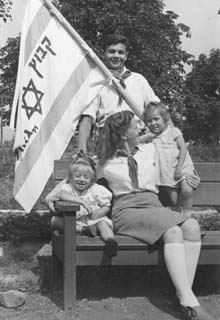
Chasia Bornstein-Bielicka in Israel

In September 1944, Bornstein-Bielicka and her underground friends Anya Rod and Lisa Chapnik returned to Grodno, which was occupied by the Soviets. They moved into their empty family homes and tried to collect every certificate, photo, and item left as a memorial to their murdered families. They searched for Jews who had been rescued, collected letters sent by Jews who had managed to escape to the Soviet Union in an attempt to locate the city's Jews, and tried to respond and tell them what had happened. They also attempted to take a parachuting course in the Soviet Army to continue to fight with the Red Army against the Nazis, but were rejected by Ilya Ehrenburg, a Jewish writer and associate of Stalin, who said "Fight, act, now start learning." They received a Soviet government scholarship and began attending school to become teachers. Bornstein-Bielicka returned to sewing in order to make a living.

Despite her difficulty in parting ways with her friends and loyal partners Anya Rod and Lisa Chapnik, who decided to stay in the Soviet Union, Bornstein-Bielicka decided to fulfill her ambition to immigrate to Israel. In September 1945, she arrived in Warsaw, where she, along with Haika Grossman, and the leaders of the Dror movement - Zivia Lubetkin, Antek Zuckerman and other members, decided to establish joint kibbutzim (plural of Kibbutz) of the Hashomer Hatzair and Dror movements in the various cities of Poland. Their goal was to gather the graduates of the movements who managed to survive, absorb them into the movement, and to work to promote their immigration to Israel. She took part in the establishment of the main leadership of Hashomer Hatzair in the city of Lodz.

In March 1946, the "Zionist Coordination for the Redemption of Jewish Children" was established by the pioneering youth movements. Its purpose was to collect all the Jewish children in Poland and the surrounding area and bring them to Israel. The JDC helped in establishing the organization and financing the redemption of the children.

Bornstein-Bielicka opened the first Jewish children's home, the Coordinatsia. She gathered orphaned Jewish children from monasteries, churches, Christian families, and other hiding places, and lived with them in the orphanage. She was their mother, a mentor, and educator, listening and documenting their stories, and dealing with their many difficulties. For the first three months, the children's home was located in Lodz, along with three other children's homes, but antisemitic actions by the Poles around it increased and it was decided to move the children to a safer place.

With the help of the Bricha men, Bornstein-Bielicka moved with the children to Germany, where they stayed for five months in the Salzheim displaced persons camp, and then moved to Dornstadt, a refugee camp that was formerly a military camp of the German Air Force. Dornstadt refugee camp was run by the United Nations Relief and Rehabilitation Administration (UNRRA), and brought together about 450 children from various orphanages. In Dornstadt, Bornstein-Bielicka, together with other instructors, established a school for children, to which emissaries from Israel came to teach. On March 10, 1947, Moshe Unger of the Zionist Youth movement Informed her that she and the older children from the orphanage were leaving tonight. The younger children were forced to stay due to the fear that the dangers and hardships of the journey would hurt them.

== Immigration to Israel ==
With the help of the survivors, the JDC, and the soldiers of the Jewish Brigade, Bornstein-Bielicka and the children were smuggled between the borders of Germany and France. On April 1, 1947, they boarded the illegal immigrant ship Theodor Herzl, and together with the other illegal immigrants were detained by British Authorities in Cyprus. For about six months, Bornstein-Bielicka stayed with them in the detention camp in Cyprus and continued to guide and educate them.

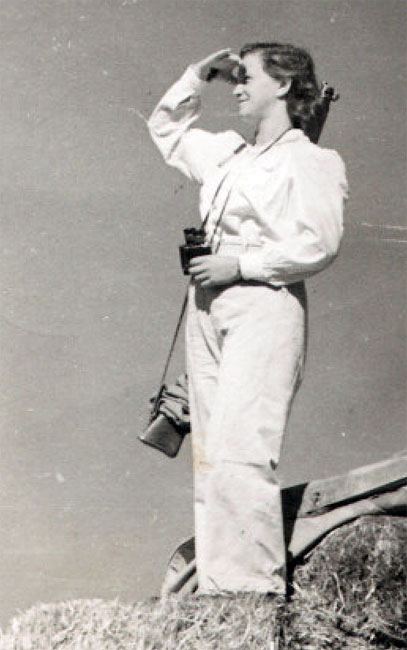
Chasia Bornstein-Bielicka in Kibbutz Lehavot HaBashan

=== Life in Israel ===
In August 1947, the children received certificates and were admitted to Israel, but Bornstein-Bielicka had to wait another month for an entry visa. After the liberation from the immigration camp, the children moved into Kibbutz Gan Shmuel. After her release, Bornstein-Bielicka joined the children in Gan Shmuel, but later decided to start a new path and joined the leadership that established Kibbutz Lehavot HaBashan .

In 1947 she married Heini Bornstein and they established a home together on the Kibbutz. They had thee daughters, Yehudit, Racheli, and Dorit. During her life on the kibbutz, she continued to work as an educator. She first opened the kindergarten in the Halasa transit camp, later Kiryat Shmona. She dealt with the absorption of youth aliyah (immigration to Israel) groups in the kibbutz and the Argentine nucleus that arrived with the outbreak of the Six-Day War. When the great Russian aliyah arrived in the 1990s, Bornstein-Bielicka rallied to help absorb families while taking advantage of her knowledge of the Russian language.

At the same time, she worked in art, established the ceramics department at Tel Hai College, created and taught and even headed the department. As a retiree, she coordinated and developed the sewing workshop in the kibbutz and returned to design and sewing. In 2003 she published her book "One of the Few: A Resistance Fighter and Educator", with the help of Naomi Yitzhar who interviewed and wrote her story.

== Death ==
In July 2012, Hassia Bornstein-Biletzky died and was buried in Kibbutz Lehavot HaBashan. She is survived by a large family: her husband Heini Bornstein, 3 daughters and sons-in-law, 11 grandchildren and 10 great-grandchildren.

== Books ==
She documented her experiences in the book One of a Few: A Resistance Fighter and Educator (Hebrew Ahat mi-meatim).
