= Mitch Kupchak =

American basketball executive and former player (born 1954)

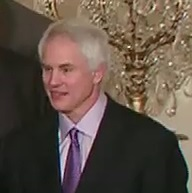
- Kupchak at the White House with the Lakers in 2010

Charlotte Hornets
- Title: Advisor
- League: NBA

Personal information
- Born: May 24, 1954 (age 72) Brentwood, New York, U.S.
- Listed height: 6 ft 9 in (2.06 m)
- Listed weight: 230 lb (104 kg)

Career information
- High school: Brentwood (Brentwood, New York)
- College: North Carolina (1972–1976)
- NBA draft: 1976: 1st round, 13th overall pick
- Drafted by: Washington Bullets
- Playing career: 1976–1986
- Position: Power forward / center
- Number: 25, 41

Career history
- 1976–1981: Washington Bullets
- 1981–1986: Los Angeles Lakers

Career highlights
- As player: 3× NBA champion (1978, 1982, 1985); NBA All-Rookie First Team (1977); Consensus second-team All-American (1976); ACC Player of the Year (1976); 2× First-team All-ACC (1975, 1976); As executive: 7× NBA champion (1987, 1988, 2000–2002, 2009, 2010)

Career statistics
- Points: 5,202 (10.2 ppg)
- Rebounds: 2,730 (5.4 rpg)
- Assists: 377 (0.7 apg)
- Stats at NBA.com
- Stats at Basketball Reference
Medals
Men's basketball
Representing United States
Olympic Games
Gold medal – first place	1976 Montreal	Team

Mitchell Kupchak (born May 24, 1954) is an American professional basketball executive and retired player. He is the former president of basketball operations and general manager of the Charlotte Hornets of the National Basketball Association (NBA). As a college player, Kupchak was an All-American at the University of North Carolina and a member of the gold medal-winning 1976 United States Olympic team. As a professional player, he won three NBA titles – one as a member of the Washington Bullets and two with the Los Angeles Lakers.

== Early life ==
Mitchell Kupchak was born on May 24, 1954, in Brentwood, New York. He attended Brentwood High School, where he excelled in basketball.

== College career ==
He was an All-American on the North Carolina Tar Heels men's basketball team, and was named Atlantic Coast Conference Player of the Year in his senior season. Kupchak played on the gold medal-winning team at the 1976 Summer Olympics in Montreal.

== Professional career ==
=== Washington Bullets (1976–1981) ===
Kupchak was drafted by the Washington Bullets in 1976 and was named to the NBA All-Rookie Team. He had four productive seasons with Washington and was part of the team that won the NBA championship in 1978.

=== Los Angeles Lakers (1981–1986) ===
He signed a long-term contract with the Lakers in 1981 at the behest of Earvin "Magic" Johnson, who told owner Jerry Buss, "If we could get Mitch Kupchak, I know we could win", after the team's playoff upset. 26 games into the season, Kupchak injured his knee and did not play again until the 1983–84 season.

Kupchak played a key role in the Showtime Lakers' 1985 championship team against the Boston Celtics, who had intimidated them in the prior year's Finals. In Game 5 of the 1986 Western Conference Finals against the Houston Rockets, a fight broke out between Kupchak and Hakeem Olajuwon, and both were ejected in what became Kupchak's final NBA game. The Rockets went on to win the game, ending the season for the Lakers. Kupchak retired after the season, having played 510 regular season and 68 playoff games, with regular season averages of 10.2 points per game and 5.4 rebounds per game (7.7 points per game and 4.7 rebounds per game in the playoffs).

== Executive career ==
=== Los Angeles Lakers (1986–2017) ===
Kupchak planned for his "life after" being an NBA player and pursued a focused program to learn the trade of running NBA team operations. While still under his initial player contract, he worked with the front office, developing strong working relationships with Laker management, beginning to "apprentice" with Jerry West, and starting studies that led to his MBA from the UCLA Anderson School of Management in 1987.

Kupchak retired from playing in 1986, and became the Lakers' assistant general manager (under GM and Basketball Hall of Famer Jerry West). He later succeeded West as General Manager, but was not considered to have all of the traditional powers of an NBA GM until 2000 (when West resigned as Vice President of Basketball Operations, for the challenge of trying to replicate the Lakers' level of success as GM of the recently relocated, last-place Memphis Grizzlies).

On July 16, 2003, after the Lakers failed to reach the NBA Finals for the first time in three years, Kupchak's first major deal was the off-season acquisitions of superstars Karl Malone and Gary Payton. After a number of controversial trade transactions over the years, including the trade of Shaquille O'Neal to the Miami Heat for Lamar Odom, Caron Butler, and Brian Grant—as well as the decision not to trade young center Andrew Bynum for point guard Jason Kidd—Kupchak faced severe criticism from Lakers franchise star Kobe Bryant, who urged his firing. However, Kupchak reportedly still had the support of the team's owner.

In 2007, Kupchak traded Brian Cook and Maurice Evans for Trevor Ariza, and the Lakers started the season off with the best record in the West. After an injury to Andrew Bynum cast their recent success in doubt, his February 2008 deal to obtain Spanish power forward Pau Gasol from the Memphis Grizzlies for Kwame Brown, Javaris Crittenton, Aaron McKie, and draft picks (one of which was the right to Marc Gasol) earned him praise (and scorn) from league insiders and fans alike. Bryant later conceded, "He goes from a F to an A-plus.", while Gregg Popovich, coach of Western Conference rival San Antonio Spurs, went so far as to argue that "there should be a trade committee that can scratch all trades that make no sense". That year, the Lakers reached the NBA Finals for the 5th time in 9 years, but would eventually lose to the Boston Celtics. The following year, they returned and won in a 4–1 rout over the Orlando Magic.

In 2009, Kupchak signed 2004 Defensive Player of the Year Ron Artest, famous for his role in the Pacers-Pistons Brawl, as a free agent. The Lakers made it to their seventh NBA Finals in 11 years, winning in a championship re-match against the Celtics in the 2010 NBA Finals. 2011 saw the retirement of longtime coach Phil Jackson, replacing him with Mike Brown, as well as an attempted three-team trade of Odom and Gasol to the Houston Rockets, in exchange for the New Orleans Hornets' All-Star point guard, Chris Paul Because the Hornets (a financial failure for its previous owners) was still owned by the NBA, Commissioner David Stern vetoed the trade for unspecified "basketball reasons"—leaving the Lakers with a publicly disgruntled Odom, and shocked Gasol (both of whom intended to end their careers as Lakers, and had not known that they were about to be traded).

On July 4, 2012, after two consecutive playoff exits in the Western Conference semi-final round, Kupchak used a traded player exception (gained by trading Odom to the Dallas Mavericks) on two-time, former NBA Most Valuable Player, Steve Nash. The deal to get Nash in a Laker uniform was finalized for a package of future draft picks and cash considerations. That same summer, Kupchak dealt Andrew Bynum, who had just been voted to his first All-Star team, in a four-way trade for his Eastern Conference counterpart, three-time Defensive Player of the Year Dwight Howard. The move was announced August 10, 2012. But the flurry of personnel changes did not stop there: Kupchak had also convinced former All-Star and Sixth Man of the Year winner Antawn Jamison to sign for a veteran-minimum contract. He later, along with owner Jerry Buss and Vice President of Basketball Operations Jim Buss (Jerry's son), also fired defense-minded head coach Mike Brown and replaced him with Nash's former head coach, offense-minded Mike D'Antoni.

During the 2013–14 season, Kupchak and the Lakers gave Kobe Bryant a 2-year, $48.5 million extension despite his being out due to an Achilles injury. The deal was reportedly endorsed by team president Jeanie Buss. D'Antoni resigned as coach of the Lakers after the team declined to pick up their option for him to coach in 2015–16, leaving Kupchak and Jim Buss the task of hiring a third coach in four years. They decided on former Lakers guard Byron Scott. The Lakers announced in April 2014 that Kupchak's own contract had been extended for multiple years. It was scheduled to expire after the 2014 season. Terms of the contract were not released.

On February 21, 2017, Kupchak was fired as general manager of the Lakers.

=== Charlotte Hornets (2018–2024) ===
On April 8, 2018, Kupchak was hired as the president of basketball operations and general manager of the Charlotte Hornets. On June 21, 2018, Kupchak made his first draft selection as the general manager of the Charlotte Hornets. He selected Shai Gilgeous-Alexander with the 11th pick, who was subsequently traded to the Los Angeles Clippers for Miles Bridges, who was selected with the 12th pick. On February 12, 2024, Kupchak stepped down from his position atop the basketball operations hierarchy and transitioned into an advisory role upon the hire of former Nets assistant GM Jeff Peterson.

== Personal life ==
Kupchak was inducted into the Suffolk Sports Hall of Fame on Long Island in the Basketball Category with the Class of 1990. In 2002, he was inducted into the National Polish-American Sports Hall of Fame. In 2022 he divorced from his wife Claire, with whom he had two children. His daughter, Alina Claire Kupchak, died on January 5, 2015, after a lengthy illness. His son Maxwell played as a forward for the UC Santa Barbara basketball team.

== Career playing statistics ==
Legend
GP	Games played	GS	Games started	MPG	Minutes per game
FG%	Field goal percentage	3P%	3-point field goal percentage	FT%	Free throw percentage
RPG	Rebounds per game	APG	Assists per game	SPG	Steals per game
BPG	Blocks per game	PPG	Points per game	**Bold**	Career high
†	Won an NBA championship

=== NBA ===
==== Regular season ====
Year	Team	GP	GS	MPG	FG%	3P%	FT%	RPG	APG	SPG	BPG	PPG
1976–77	Washington	**82**		18.5	.572		.679	6.0	.8	.3	.4	10.4
1977–78†	Washington	67		26.3	.512		.697	6.9	1.1	.4	**.6**	**15.9**
1978–79	Washington	66		24.3	.539		.743	6.5	1.3	.3	.3	14.6
1979–80	Washington	40		11.3	.419	.000	.693	2.6	.4	.2	.2	4.7
1980–81	Washington	**82**		23.6	.525	.000	.706	6.9	.8	.4	.3	12.5
1981–82	L.A. Lakers	26	**26**	**31.6**	**.573**	–	.663	**8.1**	**1.3**	**.5**	.4	14.3
1983–84	L.A. Lakers	34	3	9.5	.380	.000	.647	2.6	.2	.1	.2	3.1
1984–85†	L.A. Lakers	58	3	12.3	.504	–	.659	3.2	.4	.3	.3	5.3
1985–86	L.A. Lakers	55	0	14.2	.482	.000	**.750**	3.5	.3	.2	.1	6.0
Career		510	32	19.4	.523	.000	.704	5.4	.7	.3	.3	10.2

==== Playoffs ====
Year	Team	GP	GS	MPG	FG%	3P%	FT%	RPG	APG	SPG	BPG	PPG
1977	Washington	9		**28.0**	**.589**		**.678**	**7.6**	**1.1**	.2	.3	**16.2**
1978†	Washington	**21**		24.0	.422		.652	6.0	1.0	.2	.1	10.1
1979	Washington	8		17.1	.404		.667	4.3	.4	.3	.0	6.5
1984	L.A. Lakers	9		7.7	.294	–	.571	3.2	.2	.1	.2	2.0
1985	L.A. Lakers	16	0	12.3	.585	.000	.591	3.0	.3	.1	**.4**	4.7
1986	L.A. Lakers	5	0	11.2	.533	–	.667	3.0	.4	**.4**	.0	4.0
Career		68	0	17.9	.474	.000	.649	4.7	.6	.2	.2	7.7

== See also ==
- List of National Basketball Association team presidents
