= Bussing (surname) =

Bussing is a surname. Notable people with the surname Bussing or Busing include:

- Hans Büsing (1880–1941), German diplomat
- Wilhelm Büsing (Wehrmacht) (1901–1945), recipient of the German Knight's Cross of the Iron Cross during World War II
- Wilhelm Büsing (1921–2023), German equestrian
- Laura Bussing (born 1964), American motorcycle racer
- John Busing (born 1983), American football safety
- William Bussing (1933–2014), American ichthyologist

== See also ==
- Busse
- Bussing (disambiguation)
