= Bus (nickname) =

Bus is a nickname, notable users of which include:

- Bus Griffiths (1913–2006), cartoonist, lumberjack, and fisherman
- Bus Mertes (1921–2002), American football player and coach
- Bus Whitehead (1928–2010), American basketball player
- Bus Wilbert (1915–1946), American racecar driver
- Bus Cook, National Football League sports agent
- Harry "Bus" Yourell (1919–2011), American politician
- Jerome Bettis, "the Bus," (born 1972), National Football League player

== See also ==
- The Bus (disambiguation)
- Bus (surname)
