= Bus (surname) =

Bus is a surname. Notable people with the name include:

- Schelte J. Bus (born 1956), American astronomer
- Dave Bus (born 1978), Dutch professional footballer
- Dirk Bus (1907–1978), Dutch sculptor
- Nicole Bus, Dutch singer
- Balázs Bús, (born 1966), Hungarian social worker and politician

== See also ==
- Buș, surname
- Buss, surname
- Busse, surname
- Bus (nickname)
