= Pulau Anak Bukom =

Name transcription(s)
  - Chinese: 安娜毛广岛
  - Pinyin: ānnà máoguǎng dǎo
  - Malay: Pulau Anak Bukom
- Location of Pulau Anak Bukom within Singapore
- Coordinates: 1°13′30″N 103°46′12.50″E
- Country: Singapore

Pulau Anak Bukom is a small 0.2-hectare islet located to the south west of Singapore, between Pulau Bukom and Pulau Bukom Kechil. Anak Bukom means "child of Bukom" in Malay, a reference to its small size and location just next to Pulau Bukom.

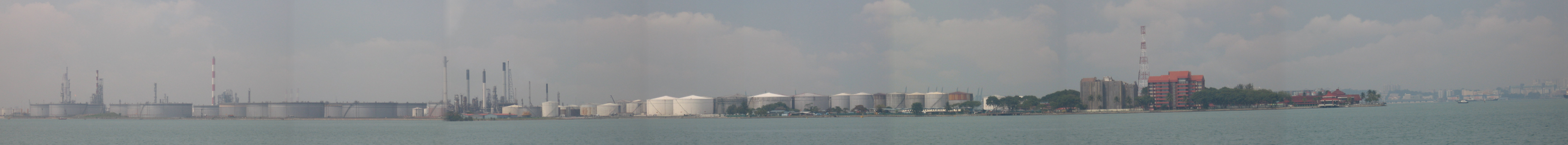
Pulau Bukom and Pulau Bukom Kechil, Western Islands, Singapore. Pulau Bukom Kechil lies to the left with the shorter grey cylindrical tanks, while Pulau Bukom, to the right, with the smaller white and grey but taller tanks and buildings. Pulau Anak Bukom is the small islet with vegetation under the cluster of chimneys at centre-left.
