= Pulau Bukom Shell oil theft =

Corruption case in Singapore

The Pulau Bukom Shell oil theft refers to a criminal corruption case in Singapore involving the theft of large quantities of oil worth S$206 million (US$151 million) from the Shell refinery on Pulau Bukom. The scheme, which ran from 2007 to 2018, involved Shell employees and external parties, all of whom were arrested and charged.

Two employees were found guilty of masterminding the theft, and were sentenced to 25 and 29 years of prison. Both employees, Juandi Pongot and Abdul Latif Ibrahim, began embezzling the marine gas oil in 2007. Pongot and Ibrahim initially was part of the same team and recruited other employees to the enterprise, but they later fell out. Between 2013 and 2018 they continued to embezzle the oil, but separately. A number of other Shell employees were also arrested and received prison sentences ranging from one year to 26.5 years. Twelve inspectors contracted by Shell were also charged in 2022 for receiving bribes. Another person who had tipped off guilty employees of an upcoming investigation was sentenced to three months' prison for obstruction of justice in 2025.
