= Bussin =

Bussin may refer to:

- Bussin, former name until 1945 of Buszyno, now a village in the administrative district of Gmina Polanów, within Koszalin County, West Pomeranian Voivodeship
- Sandra Bussin, a politician in Toronto, Ontario, Canada
- "Bussin" (Nicki Minaj and Lil Baby song), 2022
- "Bussin" (Moneybagg Yo and Rob49 song), 2024
- "Bussin'", song by Trouble
- "Bussin", song by Blueface from his EP Dirt Bag
- "Bussin Bussin", song by Lil Tecca from the F9 soundtrack

== See also ==
- Bussing (disambiguation)
