= Pulau Bukom =

Island of Singapore

- Location of Pulau Bukom within Singapore

Geography
- Location: Southeast Asia
- Coordinates: 1.2339°N 103.7656°E
- Area: 1.45 km^{2} (0.56 sq mi)

Administration
- Singapore

Pulau Bukom, also known as Pulau Bukum (Chinese: 毛广岛; Tamil: புளு புகோம்), is a small restricted-access island belonging to Singapore that is located about 5 kilometres (3.1 mi) to the south of Mainland Singapore, off the Straits of Singapore. The size of Pulau Bukom is about 145 hectares (360 acres).

Pulau Bukom is also known as Pulau Bukom Besar, which has a small companion islet to its south called Pulau Bukom Kechil. This companion islet is currently connected to Pulau Ular and Pulau Busing by reclaimed land, making the three of them appear as one large island on satellite imagery.

== History ==
The island was home to the native Malay islanders before government efforts to relocate them back to mainland Singapore for redevelopment.

It is the site of a Shell oil facility. Between 2007 and 2018, a number of the company's employees stole over 350 thousand tonnes (770 million pounds) of oil from the facility, worth over S$200 million. They were subsequently sentenced to imprisonment ranging from 21 to 29 years.

== Access ==
Access to the island is restricted. Security passes are issued only to personnel working on the island. A ferry (from the Pasir Panjang ferry terminal) serves the island. The ferry operator is Tian San Shipping. The security checks are very tight, and no unauthorized person is allowed to enter the island.

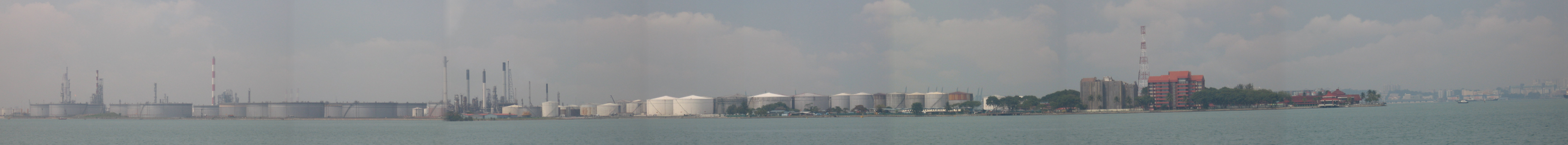
Pulau Bukom and Pulau Bukom Kechil, Western Islands, Singapore. Pulau Bukom Kechil lies to the left with the shorter grey cylindrical tanks, and Pulau Bukom, to the right, is smaller, with taller white and grey tanks and buildings. Pulau Anak Bukom is the small islet with vegetation, under the cluster of chimneys at the centre left.

== See also ==
- Laju incident

== General references ==
- Victor R Savage, Brenda S A Yeoh (2003), Toponymics - A Study of Singapore Street Names, Eastern Universities Press, ISBN 981-210-205-1
