= Evron, Israel =

Evron
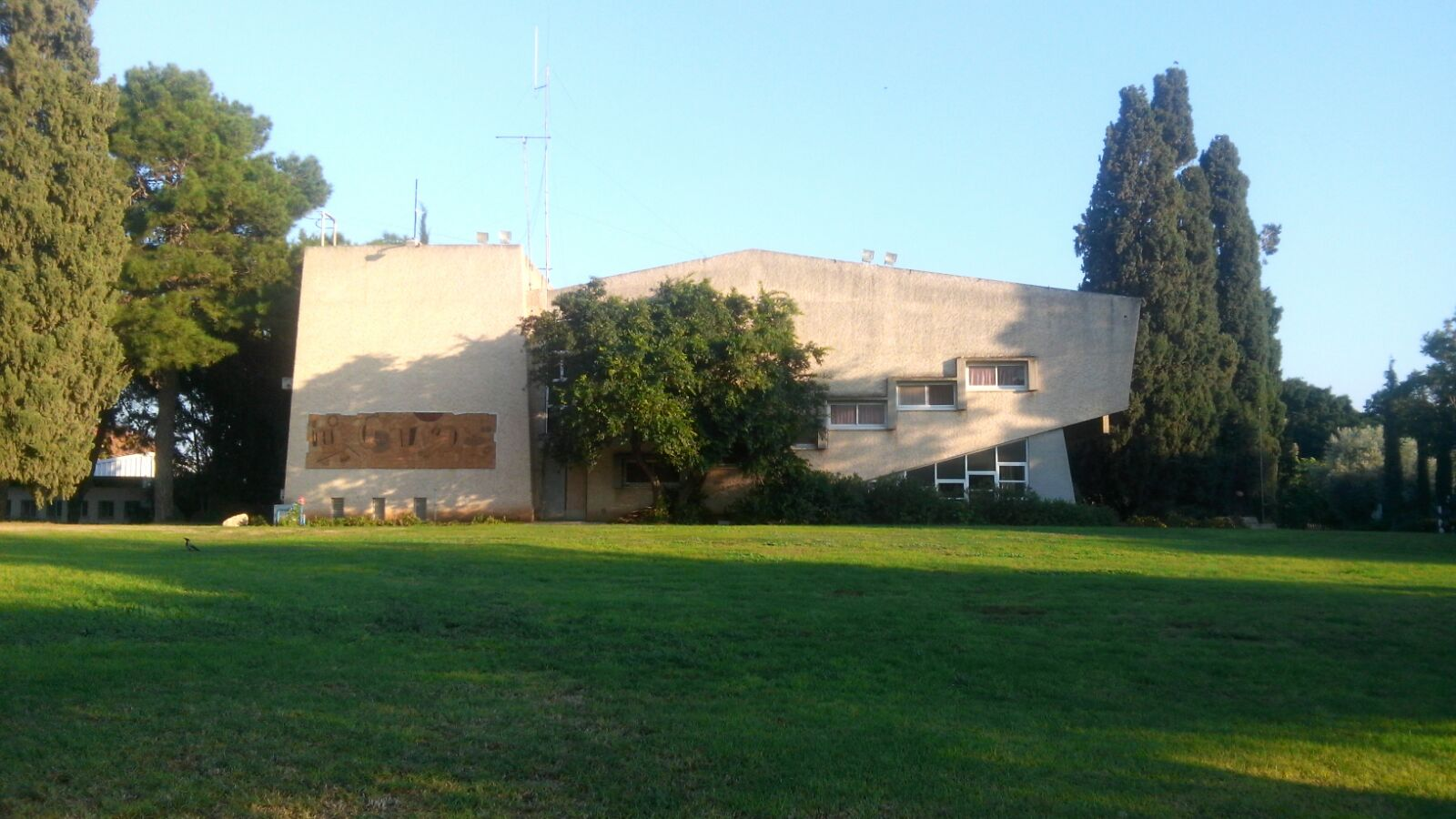

- Location within Northwest Israel
- Coordinates: 32°59′29″N 35°6′1″E
- Country: Israel
- District: Northern
- Subdistrict: Acre
- Council: Mateh Asher
- Affiliation: Kibbutz Movement
- Founded: 1945
- Founder: Polish, German and Hungarian Jews
- Population (2024): 973

Evron (Hebrew: עֶבְרוֹן) is a kibbutz in northern Israel. Situated in the western Galilee adjacent to Nahariya on the city's southeast border, it falls under the jurisdiction of Mateh Asher Regional Council. In 2024 it had a population of 973.

== History ==
Flint tools and animal bones were found at a nearby quarry dating to a million years ago. A 2022 report concluded that they show that the hominins at the site used fire.

Evron was established in 1945 and was named after the biblical Evron (עברון Joshua 19:28), which in some manuscripts appears as Avdon (עבדון), a village nearby in Asher tribe (Joshua 19:28) The founders were immigrants from Germany, Poland and Transylvania who had formed the kibbutz in 1937. In the 1940s it served as a Palmach base and a hiding place for illegal immigrants of Aliyah Bet. The founders were later joined by more immigrants from Bulgaria. Remnants of a church from the 5th century were discovered on the kibbutz land, and it has an archaeological collection with findings from the area. In the eastern part of the kibbutz is a part of an aqueduct which conducted water from the Cabri springs to Acre.

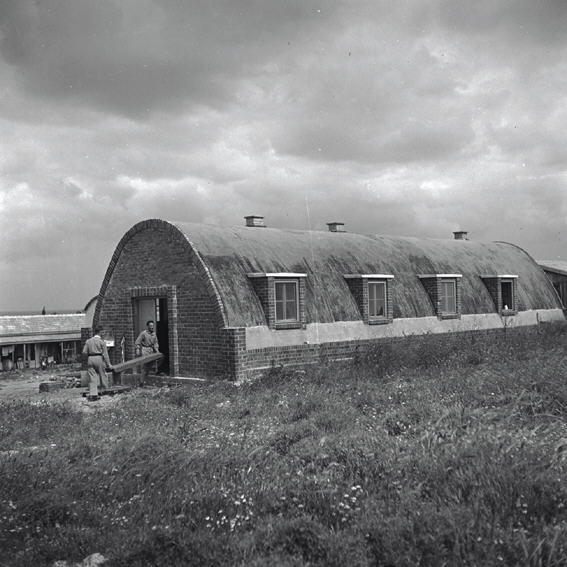
Evron 1943

== Economy ==
Evron owns 60% of Bermad, a world leader in designing & manufacturing of hydraulic control valves for irrigation, construction, water management and firefighting.

== Notable people ==
- Haika Grossman
