= Bussey =

Bussey may refer to:

== People ==
- Bussey (surname)

== Places ==
- Bussey, Iowa, USA
- Bussey Glacier, Antarctica
- Bussey Lake, Iowa, USA

== Other uses ==
- The Bussey Institute, (1883–1994), a biological institute at Harvard University, USA
- Bussey Middle School, Garland, Texas, USA
