= Kemmerer Hotel =

- Formerly listed on the U.S. National Register of Historic Places
- Location within Wyoming Location within the United States
- Location: Pine and Sapphire, Kemmerer, Wyoming
- Coordinates: 41°47′39″N 110°32′18″W
- Area: less than one acre
- Built: 1898
- NRHP reference No.: 85003064

Significant dates
- Added to NRHP: December 2, 1985
- Removed from NRHP: December 11, 2013

The Kemmerer Hotel in Kemmerer, Wyoming was a hotel having historic status—it was added to the National Register of Historic Places—which was nonetheless demolished in 2003. The hotel remained on the National Register until 2013, when it was delisted.

Located at Pine and Sapphire in Kemmerer, it was built during 1897–98.

It was listed on the National Register of Historic Places in 1985.
