= Haika Grossman =

Israeli politician (1919–1996)

- חייקה גרוסמן
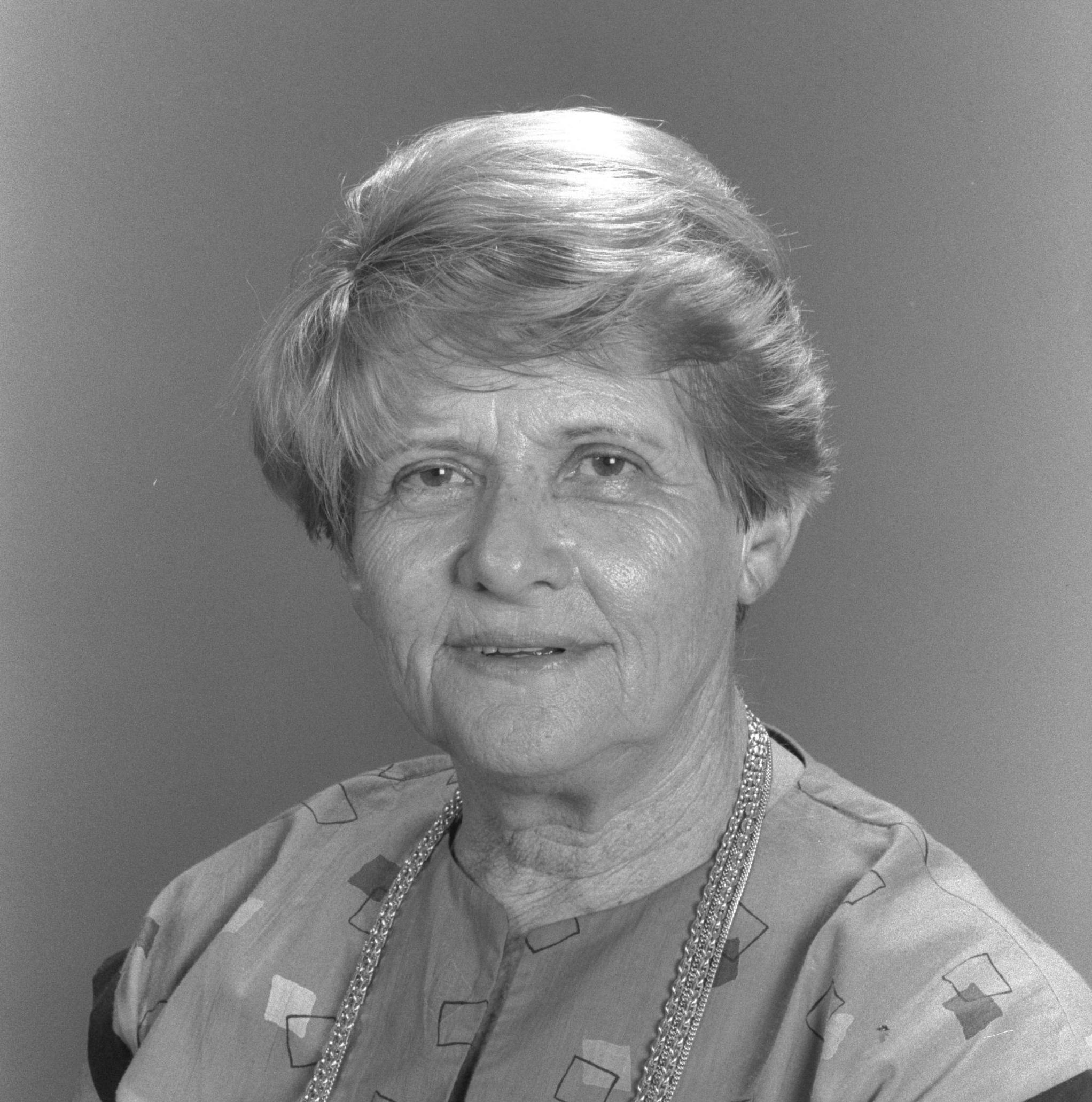

Faction represented in the Knesset
- 1969–1977: Alignment
- 1977: Mapam
- 1977–1981: Alignment
- 1984: Alignment
- 1984–1988: Mapam

Personal details
- Born: 20 November 1919 Białystok, Poland
- Died: 26 May 1996 (aged 76) Israel

Haika Grossman (Hebrew: חייקה גרוסמן; 20 November 1919 – 26 May 1996) was an Israeli politician and member of Knesset. In her youth, she was a Zionist leader in Europe, a partisan, and a participant in the ghetto uprisings in occupied Poland.

Grossman was born in Białystok, Poland. As a teenager, she joined HaShomer HaTzair. As a leader of the movement in Poland, she was sent to the town of Brześć Litewski to organize the movement's activities there and in the surrounding region.

When World War II erupted, she moved to Wilno (now Vilnius, Lithuania), where she was active in the emergency underground leadership of HaShomer HaTzair. Upon the Nazi invasion of the Soviet Union in 1941, she returned to Białystok, where she helped organize the underground movement in the Białystok Ghetto. She served as a courier between that ghetto and those of Wilno, Lublin, Warsaw and others. Using forged papers, she managed to pass as a Polish woman named Halina Woranowicz. Her Polish identity enabled her to assist the underground movements in numerous towns and ghettoes, as well as the emerging partisan units being formed in the nearby forests of Poland and Lithuania. Aided by Otto Busse, she also purchased arms and helped smuggle them into the ghettoes. In 1943, she took part in the Białystok Ghetto Uprising, and helped to establish an underground unit.

After the war, Grossman served on the Central Committee of the Jews of Poland, and was awarded medal for outstanding heroism. She emigrated to Mandatory Palestine in 1948 and joined Kibbutz Evron in the Western Galilee. She also served in various capacities in the Mapam Party. From 1950 to 1951 she was the head of Ga'aton Regional Council.

From 1969 to 1988 (aside from a break between 1981 and 1984), Grossman was a member of Knesset for Mapam and the Alignment (an alliance which Mapam was part of). As a parliamentarian, she focused on social issues and the status of women. Among the laws she helped pass were the right to abortions, laws relating to at-risk youth, and the law against beating children.

In 1993, Grossman was invited to light one of twelve torches traditionally kindled in the national ceremony marking Yom Ha'atzma'ut (Israel's Independence Day). Later, at a party for the torch lighters, she slipped down a flight of stairs and fell into a coma, which lasted three years, until her death in 1996.

== Commemoration ==
In 2001, the educational center "Beit Haika" was inaugurated in Kibbutz Evron. The center includes a library, a reception hall, an auditorium and a study room that also serves as a memorial room for Grossman and contains much of her estate. On the entrance wall are engraved her words: "Do not weep at the graves of heroes and do not be ashamed of your mercy. We are not asking you to show mercy to the world, but deeds. Deeds that will free humanity from the nightmares of oppression and slavery".

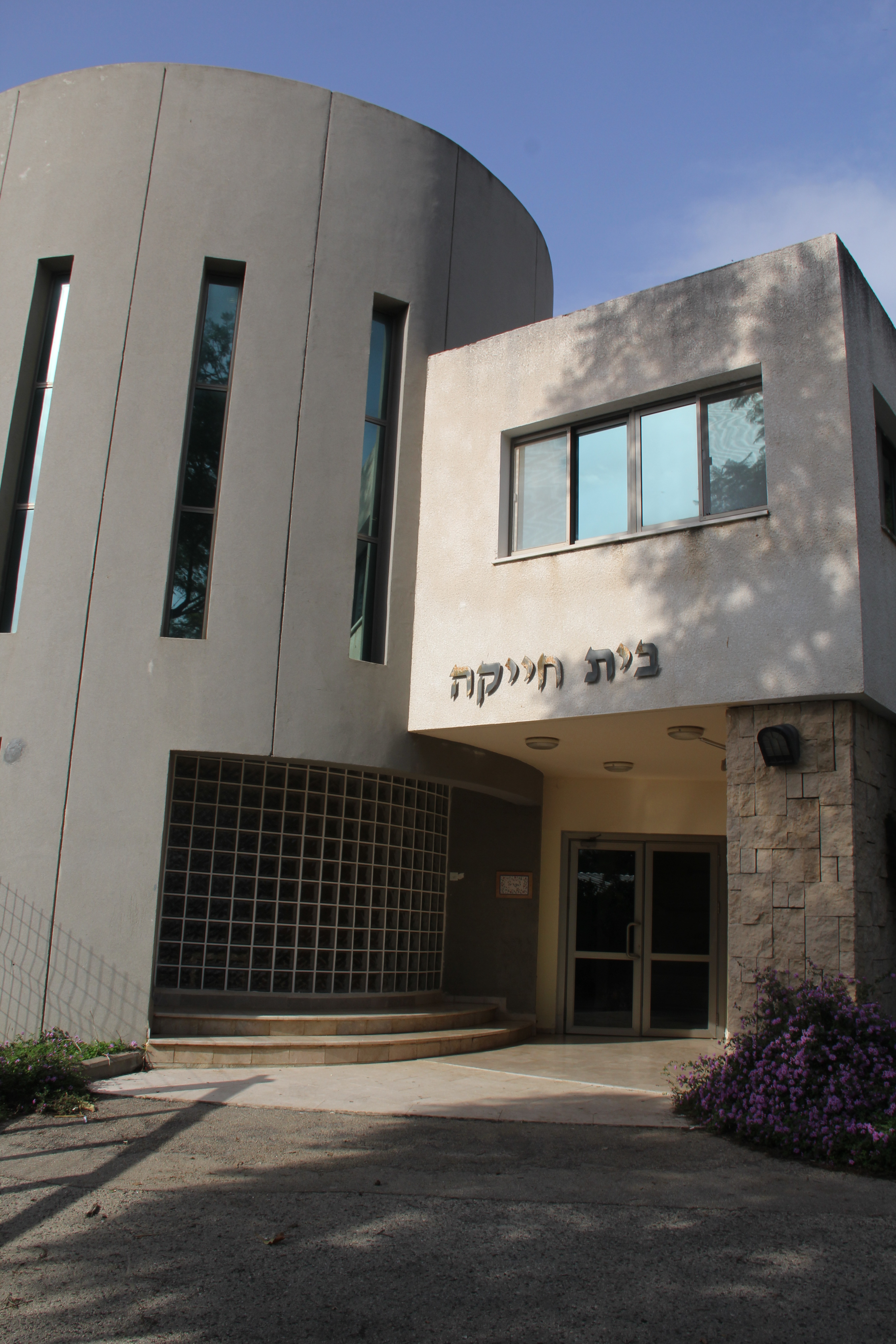
Haika house

Streets in Jaffa, Petah Tikva, Kfar Saba, Rishon Lezion and Ra'anana are named after her. In 2024 the Białystok city hall named after her a square located in the former ghetto's territory.

== Notes ==
- Israel Gutman, Encyclopaedia of the Holocaust, New York: Macmillan, 1990, vol. 2. pp. 621–622. Photo
- Memorial site

== Book ==
- Grossman, Haika. The Underground Army: Fighters of the Bialystok Ghetto, Holocaust Library, 426pp.; 1988.
