= Buș =

Buș is a surname. Notable people with the surname include:

- Laurențiu Buș (born 1987), Romanian footballer
- Sergiu Buș (born 1992), Romanian footballer, brother of Laurențiu

== See also ==
- Bus (surname)
