= Bank of the United States =

Bank of the United States may refer to:

- First Bank of the United States (1791–1811)
- Second Bank of the United States (1816–1836)
- Bank of United States (1913–1930), a commercial bank not affiliated with the government
- Bank of the United States (Charleston, South Carolina), in the Charleston Historic District

== See also ==
- Independent Treasury (1846–1921), a system for the retaining of government funds in the United States Department of the Treasury and its subtreasuries
- Federal Reserve System (1913–present), a system of banks controlling access to currency
- U.S. Bank, a commercial bank not affiliated with the government
- Bank of America, a financial services company
