= Martin Busse =

German footballer

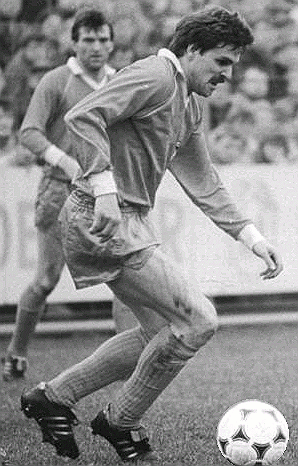

Personal information
- Full name: Martin Busse
- Date of birth: 30 June 1958 (age 68)
- Place of birth: East Germany
- Position: Midfielder

Senior career*
Years	Team	Apps	(Gls)
1977–1988	FC Rot-Weiß Erfurt	202	(58)
1988–1990	BSG Robotron Sömmerda		
1990–1991	Terengganu FC		
1991	FSV Sömmerda		

International career
1983	East Germany	3	(1)
- * Club domestic league appearances and goals

Martin Busse (born 30 June 1958) is a retired football midfielder.

During his club career, Busse spent his entire career at FC Rot-Weiß Erfurt, making over 200 appearances for them. He played three times for the East Germany national team, scoring one goal.
