= Otto Busse (resistance fighter) =

German resistance fighter (1901–1980)

- Born: 23 September 1901; Gillandwirszen (Tilsit), East Prussia, German Empire
- Died: 6 March 1980 (aged 78); Germany

Otto Busse (pronounced [ˈɔtoː ˈbʊsə]; 23 September 1901 – 6 March 1980) was a German resistance fighter and Righteous Among the Nations.

== Biography ==
Busse was born into a peasant family in Gillandwirszen (modern Gilandviršiai, Lithuania) near Tilsit (East Prussia), the youngest of seven brothers. Busse became a house painter and established a self-employed business in Tilsit.

He joined the Nazi Party in 1933 but left the party in protest against the anti-Jewish policy in 1935: In June 1940, under pressure of local officials, he became a member of the Nazi party again.

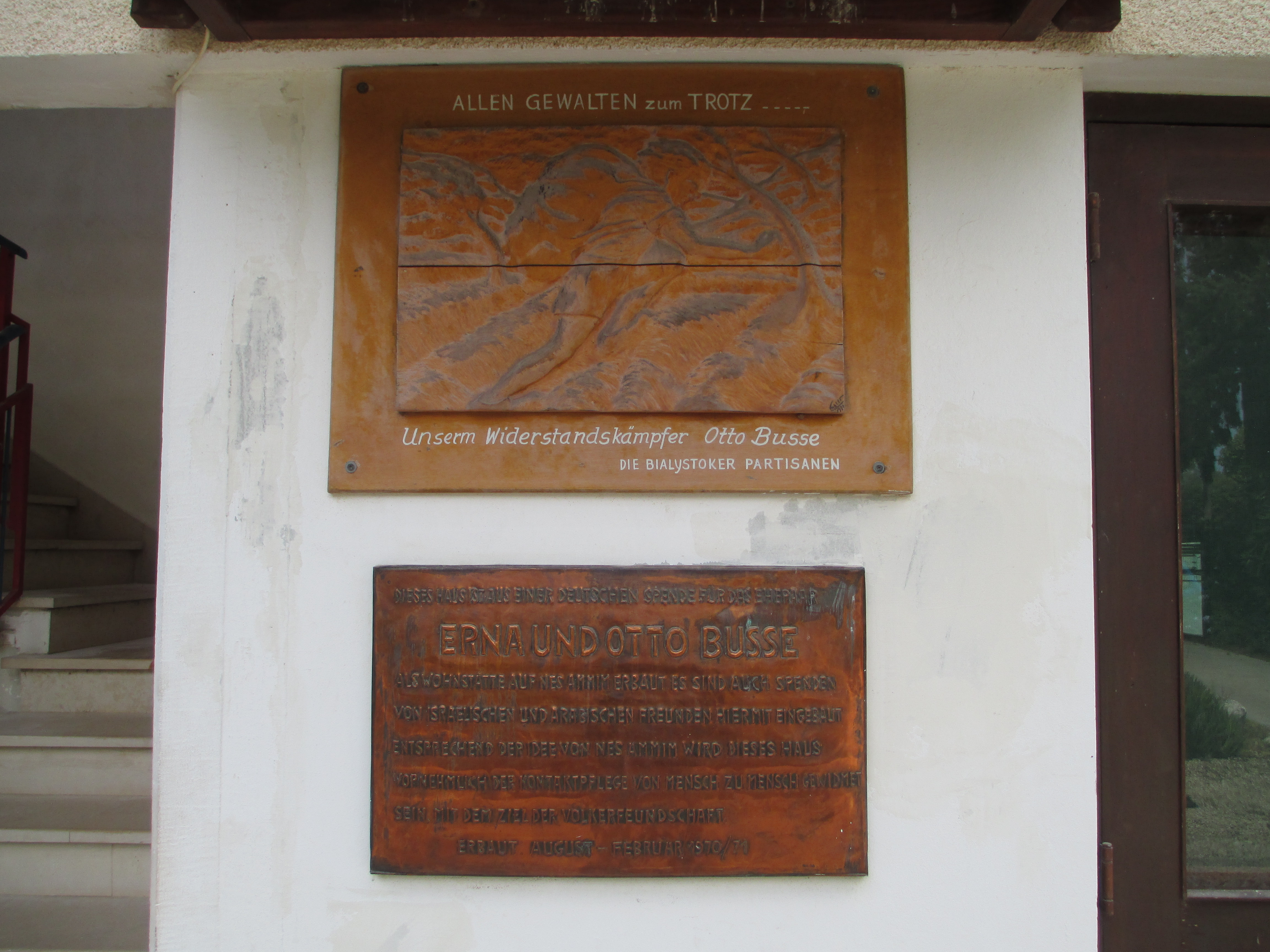
Memorial plaque at Busse's house in Nes Ammim

In World War II Busse was drafted into a police reserve unit under the command of Friedrich Brix, who later became head of the civil administration of the Bezirk Bialystok. Initiated by Brix, Busse left service in March 1943 and moved to Białystok to operate a painter's business, here he mainly renovated Wehrmacht hospitals and apartments vacated by Jewish residents.

Busse employed local Poles and Jewish forced laborer from the Białystok Ghetto. On one occasion he inspected an apartment, where he found two German-speaking women - Haika Grossman and Chasia Bilitzka - both in fact leaders of the Jewish underground. Busse, unaware of this background, offered them work as secretaries in his business.

Through Bilitzka and Grossman, Busse realized the horrors of the Holocaust and began to cooperate with underground organizations. The Jews he employed were, at least temporarily, excluded from the transports to the death camps. Busse also provided weapons, clothing and medicines for the resistance fighters at his own expense, he once even took part in a meeting of partisans. His office was used for the production of leaflets and his apartment as a temporary weapons cache.

Busse left Białystok in the second half of 1944 and was drafted into military service close to the war's end. He was captured by the Soviets and became a prisoner of war in the Soviet Union in a camp near Kiev. He was released after five years of captivity and moved to West Germany.

In 1958, Busse was able to reestablish contact with Chasia Bilitzka and Haika Grossman, both were now living in Israel, and Busse moved to Nes Ammim, a settlement of German and Dutch Christians in Israel. On 25 June 1968, Yad Vashem recognized Otto Busse as Righteous Among the Nations.

Busse lived in Israel and frequently returned to Germany. He died in 1980.
