= Jeanie Buss =

American sports executive (born 1961)

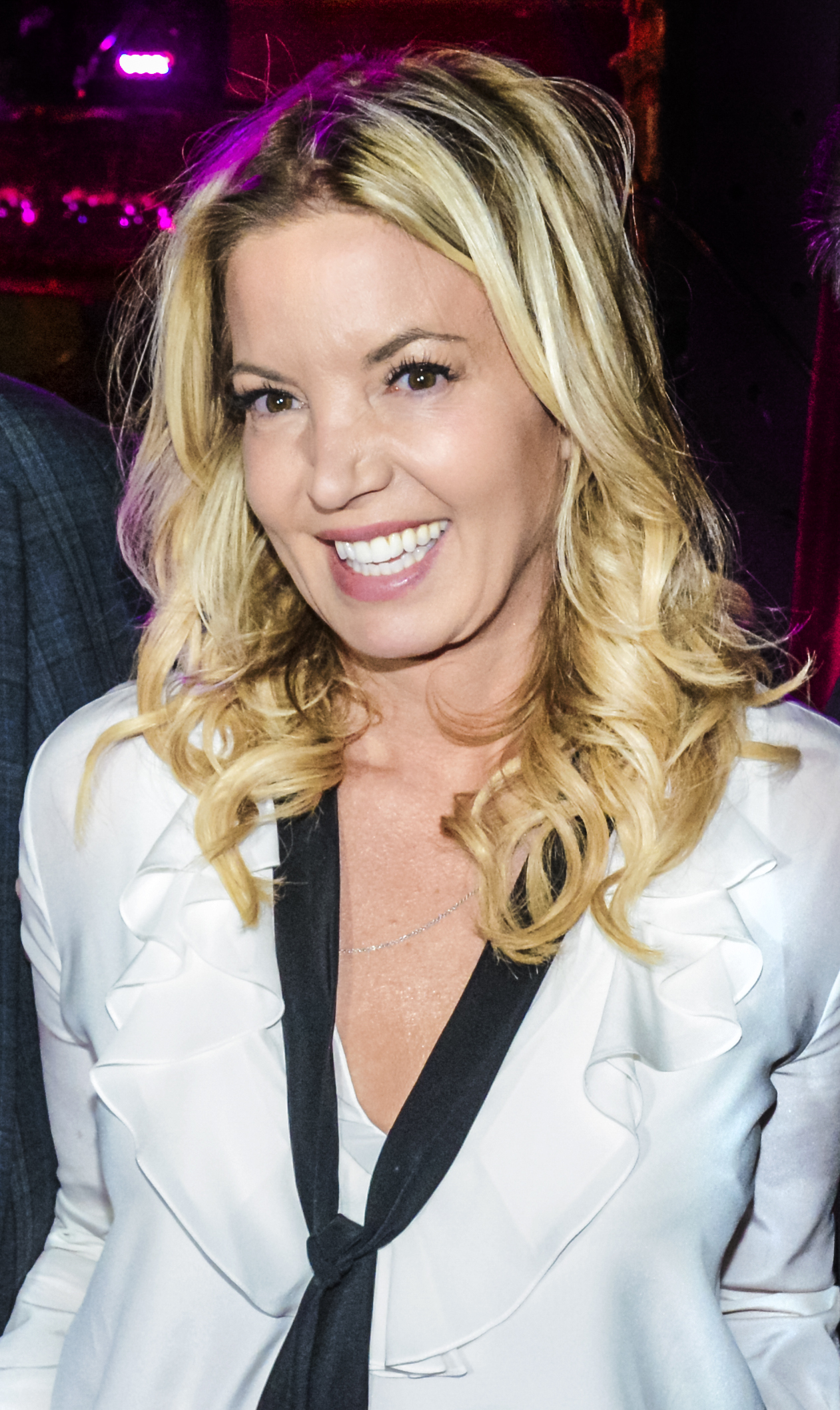
- Buss in 2016
- Born: Jeanie Marie Buss; September 26, 1961 (age 64); Santa Monica, California, U.S.
- Education: University of Southern California (BBA)
- Occupations: Governor of the Los Angeles Lakers; Co-owner of the Women of Wrestling promotion
- Spouses: Steve Timmons (m. 1990; div. 1993); Jay Mohr (m. 2023)
- Partner(s): Phil Jackson (1999–2016)
- Father: Jerry Buss
- Awards: Six-time NBA champion NBA Cup (2023); 2023 Sports Emmy Award

Jeanie Marie Buss (born September 26, 1961) is an American sports executive who is the governor and minority owner of the Los Angeles Lakers of the National Basketball Association (NBA). She is also co-owner and promoter of the U.S. women's professional wrestling promotion Women of Wrestling (WOW).

A daughter of Jerry Buss, who owned the Lakers and other sports businesses, she entered the family business as general manager of the Los Angeles Strings professional tennis team at 19. She later bought the Los Angeles Blades professional roller hockey team. She served as president of the Great Western Forum before becoming vice president of the Lakers. After her father died in 2013, his controlling ownership of the Lakers passed to his six children via a family trust, with each sibling receiving an equal vote. Buss took over as team president and as the Lakers representative on the NBA Board of Governors. In 2020, she became the first female controlling owner to guide her team to an NBA championship, giving her six NBA titles overall as an owner/executive.

== Early life ==
Buss was born in Santa Monica, California, to Joann and Jerry Buss. She grew up with older brothers Johnny and Jim and younger sister Janie. Their parents divorced in 1972, leaving Buss feeling emotionally abandoned. At age 14, Buss attended World Team Tennis meetings with her father, who owned the Los Angeles Strings. When she was 17, she moved in with her father at Pickfair. She became so familiar with the estate that she led guided tours. Buss attended college at the University of Southern California (USC), where she majored in business and graduated with honors.

== Professional career ==
=== Non-Lakers sports management ===
World TeamTennis folded in 1978, and was revived in 1981 as TeamTennis. Jerry once again owned the second incarnation of the Strings, and he appointed the 19-year-old Jeanie as the general manager while she was studying at USC. "Basically, my dad bought me the team," said Buss. After the Strings folded in 1993, Buss brought professional roller hockey to Los Angeles as owner of the Los Angeles Blades in Roller Hockey International. The league named her Executive of the Year.

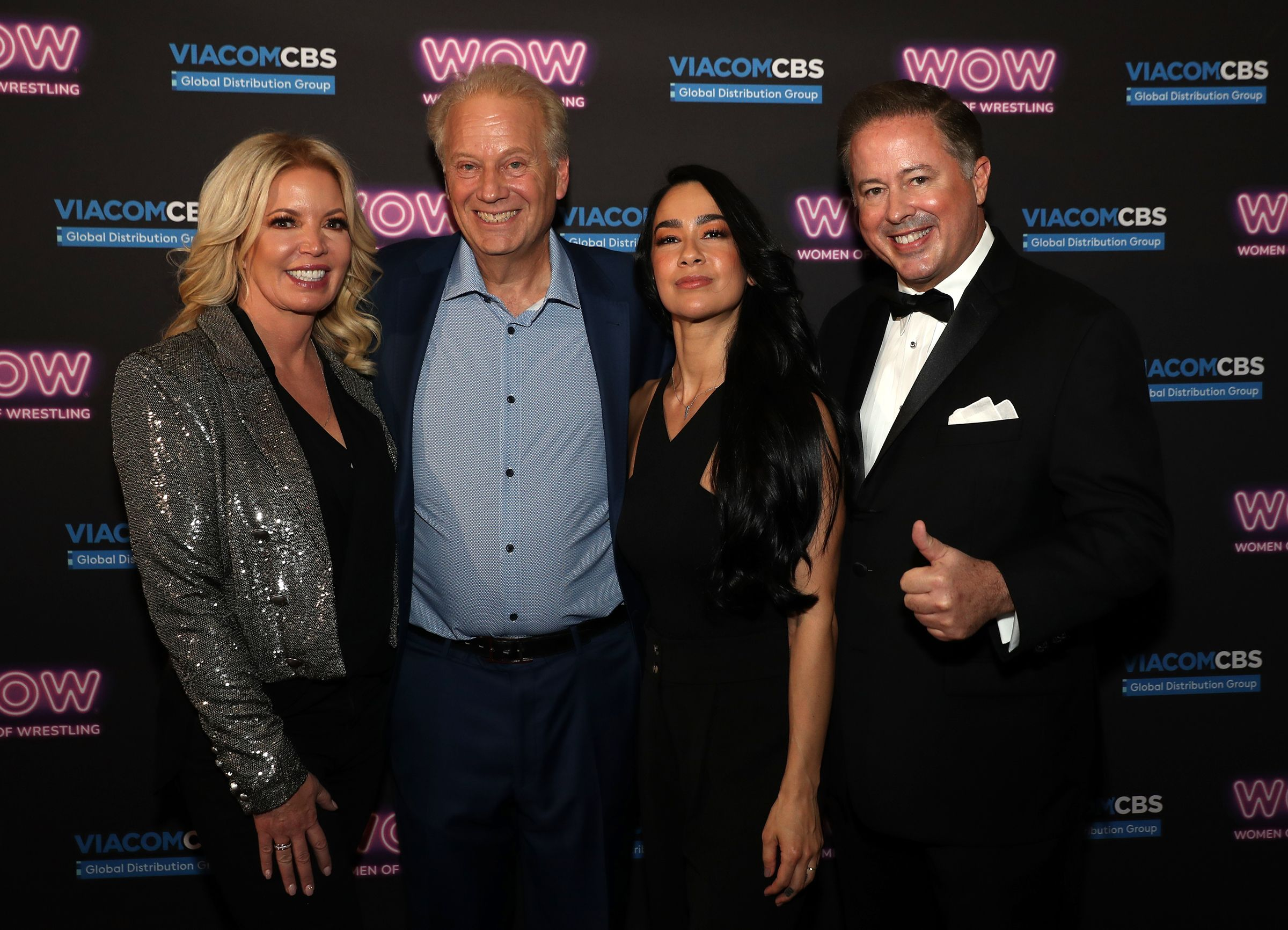
Buss (left) with ViacomCBS executive Dan Cohen and Women of Wrestling executive producers AJ Mendez and David McLane in 2021

Buss is the owner of the WOW-Women Of Wrestling. On October 6, 2021, on top of the Circa Resort & Casino in Las Vegas, ViacomCBS Global Distribution President Dan Cohen announced alongside Buss and her long time business partner David McLane that ViacomCBS had entered into a multi-year distribution agreement for WOW. The distribution for WOW marks the largest media distribution platform for an organization that solely promotes women's wrestling in U.S. history.

=== Los Angeles Lakers ===
Buss served four years as president of the Great Western Forum, then the home arena of the Lakers. Throughout her stint with the Forum, her role with the Lakers increased, and she served as the Alternate Governor on the NBA Board of Governors since 1995. In 1999, she was named executive vice president of business operations for the Lakers. Her brother Jim was promoted to vice president of player personnel in 2005. Their father's plan was to have Jeanie handle the business decisions of the team, while Jim handled the basketball side of the Lakers.

Sporting News in 2005 named Buss as one of the Top 20 Most Influential Women in Sports. In 2011, Forbes called Buss "one of few powerful women in sports management", and ESPN said she is "one of the most powerful women in the NBA".

==== Controlling owner ====
After her father died in 2013, his 66% controlling ownership of the Lakers passed via a trust to his six children, including his two sons with his girlfriend Karen Demel—Joey and Jesse Buss. Each of Jerry's children received an equal vote. His succession plan had Jeanie assume his previous title as the Lakers' governor as well as its team representative at NBA Board of Governors meetings. She became president of the Lakers, leading the team's business operations, while her brother Jim continued as executive VP of basketball operations. She had ultimate operational authority and could overrule Jim's decisions. However, she commented in 2013 that "I would be more comfortable if I understood what the decision process [on the Lakers' basketball side] was, and I'm not always involved in it."

Jeanie and Jim had already been clashing for some time, as Jeanie expected the team to rehire Phil Jackson as head coach in 2012, only for Jim to hire Mike D'Antoni. Jeanie publicly criticized Jim's decision in her book Laker Girl, upsetting Jim. During the 2013–14 NBA season, Jim pledged that if the Lakers were not contending for a conference title or the NBA championship in three or four years, he would resign. Shortly before his timeline ran out, he signed two veterans to large, win-now contracts. NBC Sports' Dan Feldman opined that the deals "place[d] [Buss'] self-preservation over the Lakers' best long-term interests."

==== 2017 ownership dispute ====
In February 2017, Buss fired her brother Jim and general manager Mitch Kupchak. ESPN reported that in addition to the team's multi-year decline in performance, she was upset that Jim did not consult her before making key trades, which she had previously instructed him to do. To replace him and Kupchak, she hired Laker legend and former minority owner Magic Johnson as President of Basketball Operations and sports agent Rob Pelinka as general manager. She later said that she did not go through a public interview process to hire a GM because she did not want to tip off her brother, who might have (and did) respond by attempting to seize control of the team.

In response, her brother Johnny (who supported Jim) attempted to remove Buss from the team's board of directors; according to one interpretation of the Lakers' organizational bylaws, this would force her to step down as controlling owner. She filed a lawsuit to confirm her control over the team, in which she argued that the family trusts' governing documents required her to be the controlling owner and a team director. She said that she had given Jim "ample time to prove himself." The dispute was resolved in Buss's favor when her siblings gave her lifetime operational control over the team.

==== Selling majority stake ====
In 2025, the Buss family sold its majority stake in the Lakers to a group headed by Mark Walter at a team valuation of $10 billion. The Busses retained a 17.8% share of the team, with Jeanie announced as the team's governor for at least the next five years. A minority owner is allowed to be governor if they own at least 15% of their team.

== Personal life ==
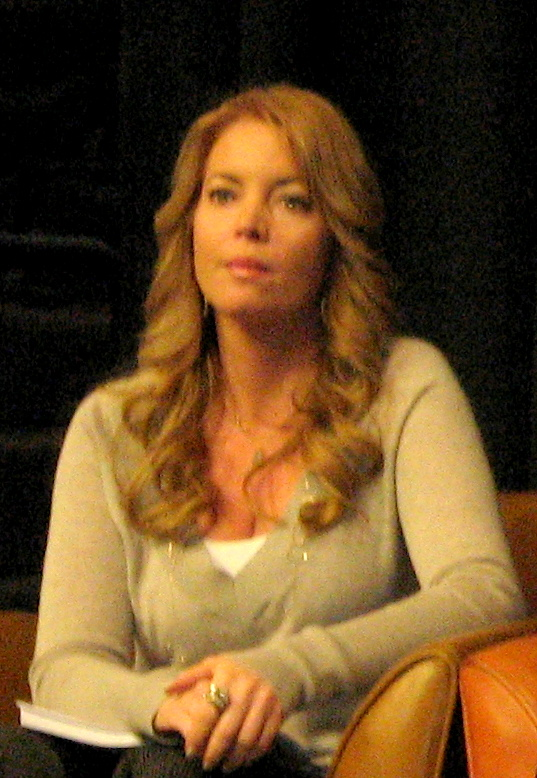
Buss in 2009

Buss married volleyball player Steve Timmons in 1990, but divorced after three years. According to Buss, "I never put my marriage first ... It was always business which attracted me." Buss stated that she never had children for this focus on working, feeling she could not simultaneously "do enough in your job so you don't get behind" and also "do enough so you don't miss milestones of your child's development". She posed nude in the May 1995 issue of Playboy.

Buss began dating then-Lakers head coach Phil Jackson in December 1999, and they became engaged in 2013. On December 27, 2016, they announced the termination of their engagement in a joint statement on Twitter. After their breakup, Buss consulted with Jackson for input on the Lakers.

In December 2018, Buss received correspondence from an individual who asserted to be her secret sibling named Lee. Lee was the first child of Jerry Buss and JoAnn Mueller, having been given up for adoption. Lee expressed a desire to connect with not only Buss but also her mother and the rest of the siblings, which was arranged.

In September 2021, Buss announced on Twitter that she was in a relationship with comedian Jay Mohr. They reportedly began dating in 2017. On December 21, 2022, they publicly announced their engagement; and on September 3, 2023, they married in a private ceremony in Malibu.

== In popular media ==
In the 2022 sports drama Winning Time: The Rise of the Lakers Dynasty, Buss (portrayed by Hadley Robinson) was a main character. Buss said that the program did not reflect her real life in the 1980s, but expressed some approval for the portrayal. She also applauded the show's portrayal of her father Jerry Buss, portrayed by John C. Reilly and expressed disappointment after its cancellation. Her husband, Jay Mohr, appeared as a guest actor in the show's second season playing Kareem Abdul-Jabbar's business manager.

Journalist Matt Brennan spoke of the inaccuracies of the Jeanie Buss character, saying:

"The role that Jeanie played in building the Lakers organization isn’t exactly right in Winning Time — she wasn’t a key player in 1979. But she did work her way up in the ’80s, and now she’s in charge of the whole shebang. Winning Time drew inspiration from that."

Buss inspired the main character in the 2025 comedy Running Point, which she also executive produced. The character—played by Kate Hudson—is a fictionalized basketball executive who took over the fictionalized Los Angeles Waves from her father. Buss supported Hudson's casting due in part to their friendship dating back to the 1990s. She approvingly described the character as "more 'me' than what people see every day about me"

== Awards and honors ==
NBA

- Six-time NBA champion
  - Five as a member of the Lakers front office (2000–2002, 2009, 2010)
  - One as controlling owner (2020)
- 2023 NBA Cup winner (as owner of the Lakers)

Sports Emmy Awards

- 2023 Outstanding Documentary Series (as executive producer of Legacy: The True Story of the LA Lakers)

== Publications ==
- Buss, Jeanie; Springer, Steve (2010). Laker Girl. Triumph Books. ISBN 9781600785115.
