= The Bus =

The Bus may refer to:

== Arts and entertainment ==
- The Bus (TV series), a reality television show
- The Bus (video game), a bus simulation game by TML-Studios
- "The Bus" (The Amazing World of Gumball), an episode of the television series The Amazing World of Gumball
- "The Bus", an episode of the American television series Without A Trace
- "The Bus", an episode of the American television series M*A*S*H
- The Bus, a comic strip by Paul Kirchner, originally published in Heavy Metal magazine
- "The Bus", 1965 documentary by Haskell Wexler that follows a group of Freedom Riders
- "The Bus", the primary transport used in the first two seasons of Agents of S.H.I.E.L.D..
- KDRB, branded as 100.3 The Bus, a radio station in Des Moines, Iowa

== People ==
- Jerome Bettis (born 1972), former National Football League player nicknamed "The Bus"
- Julian Savea (born 1990), New Zealand rugby player nicknamed "The Bus"
- Va'aiga Tuigamala (1969–2022), rugby player nicknamed "The Bus"

== Public transportation ==
- TheBus (Honolulu), Hawaii
- TheBus (Prince George's County), Maryland
- TheBus (Hernando County, Florida)
- The Bus (Stillwater), Oklahoma
- The Bus (Springfield, Missouri)
- TheBus, operated by Cornwall Transit in Ontario, Canada
- The Bus, operated by the Marble Valley Regional Transit District in Rutland County, Vermont
- The Bus, operated by Merced County Transit in California

== See also ==
- Bus (disambiguation)
