= Jesse Buss =

American sports executive

Jesse Buss (born 1987 or 1988) is an American sports executive. From 2006 to 2025, he worked for the Los Angeles Lakers. He was known as the team's “draft guru.”

== Career ==
=== Lakers ===
Buss began working for the Lakers in 2006, as a basketball operations assistant. In 2008, he became a scout; in 2011, scouting coordinator; in 2013, scouting director; and in 2015, an assistant general manager.

For the next decade, together with his brother Joey, Buss played a key role in the Lakers’ scouting and player-development operation. They helped to find and cultivate key role players such as Max Christie, Jordan Clarkson, Josh Hart, Austin Reaves, Julius Randle, and Ivica Zubac.

Buss was involved in the NBA draft year-round, playing a leading role in the Lakers’ draft strategy. According to Fox Sports, Jesse and Joey “have been praised for their roles in the Lakers’ successful drafts and free-agent signings.”

When Jerry Buss died in 2013, ownership of the Lakers transitioned to a trust controlled by his children. (Jesse is Jerry's youngest child and was born in the 1980s to Jerry's girlfriend Karen Demel.)

In June 2025, Mark Walter, the chairman of the Los Angeles Dodgers, agreed to buy the controlling interest of the Lakers from the Buss family, at a $10 billion valuation. At the time, this valuation was the highest for a professional sports franchise. The NBA's board of governors approved the sale in October 2025.

In November 2025, as part of overhauling the scouting staff, the Lakers fired Buss, along with his brother Joey, the team's alternate governor, vice president of research and development, and president of the team's G League affiliate, the South Bay Lakers. Both Buss brothers retained their minority ownership shares.

=== Buss Sports Capital ===
In September 2025, Joey and Jesse created Buss Sports Capital, an investment company specializing in sports.

=== Left Coast Legends ===
Buss is the program director for a youth basketball program, the Left Coast Legends, which is part of the Amateur Athletic Union. In 2025, Buss donated a basketball court to the Bel Air Presbyterian School, where the Legends practice.

== Personal life ==
In 2023, Buss married Sarah Jordan, at their home in Los Angeles. They have two sons.

As of November 2025, Buss has been dealing with an unspecified illness for several years, for which he receives immunotherapy treatments.
