= Jim Buss =

American basketball executive

- Born: James Hatten Buss; November 9, 1959 (age 66); Los Angeles County, California, U.S.
- Occupation: Part owner of the Los Angeles Lakers
- Parent: Gerald Buss

James Hatten Buss (born November 9, 1959) is an American sports executive. He is a part-owner and former executive vice president of basketball operations of the Los Angeles Lakers in the National Basketball Association (NBA). He is the son of former Lakers owner Jerry Buss. Buss was president of the Los Angeles Lazers professional indoor soccer team from 1985 to 1989. He later trained thoroughbred race horses for nine years before joining the Lakers in 1998 as an assistant general manager. He was promoted to vice president of basketball operations in 2005. After his father died in 2013, his controlling ownership of the Lakers passed to his children via a family trust, with each child receiving an equal interest.

== Early life ==
Buss was born the second of four children to Jo Ann and Jerry Buss. He grew up with older brother Johnny and sisters Jeanie and Janie. Their parents divorced in 1972.

Buss attended college at University of Southern California (USC), majoring in math before he dropped out. He spent much of his youth at race tracks. Although he stood 6 feet 2 inches (1.88 m), Buss attended jockey school when he was 20. (Note: Jockeys typically stand around 4 ft 10 in (1.47 m) to 5 ft 6 in (1.68 m).)

== Professional career ==
Buss invested in a small business with his best friend, but the friend died in a car accident in 1981. The death left Buss devastated and lost, and the business was left to fade. In 1985, Buss became president of his father's indoor soccer team, the Los Angeles Lazers, after his brother Johnny had quit. Buss brought annual losses down from $1 million to $500,000, but the team folded in 1989. He next became a horse trainer, receiving from his father the half-dozen thoroughbreds he owned. In 1997, Jerry divested himself of his horse racing stock that was increasingly unprofitable. Shortly after, he invited his son to join the Lakers, a basketball team he acquired in 1979 and built into one of the most lucrative and popular franchises in all of sports.

Buss started with the Lakers in 1998 as an apprentice to general manager Jerry West and his assistant, Mitch Kupchak. During an interview with Sports Illustrated for its November 1998 issue, Jim shared his thoughts on scouting, saying: "Evaluating basketball talent is not too difficult. If you grabbed 10 fans out of a bar and asked them to rate prospects, their opinions would be pretty much identical to those of the pro scouts." He later said he was trying to compliment Lakers scouts, who faced a challenge with the team usually picking late in the NBA draft compared to the consensus he believed existed with lottery picks, but the quote became controversial nevertheless.

Buss continued to learn the basketball business from his father as well as West and then Kupchak, who was promoted to general manager in 2000. After the Lakers lost in the 2004 NBA Finals, Buss decided that the Lakers would sign Rudy Tomjanovich to replace the outgoing Phil Jackson. That summer, Tomjanovich was signed to a five-year, $30 million contract. Tomjanovich resigned after a half season, citing mental and physical exhaustion. The Lakers paid him a $10 million settlement, leading to speculation that the Lakers had instead terminated his contract. In 2005, Buss was promoted to vice president of player personnel. His father's plan was to have Buss handle the basketball decisions for the team, while his sister Jeanie, the vice president of business operations, handled the business side of the Lakers.

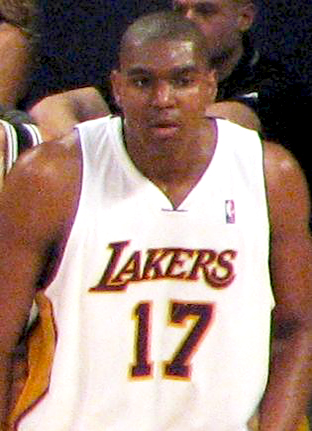
Buss persuaded the Lakers to draft Andrew Bynum

In the 2005 draft, Buss was a key proponent of selecting 17-year-old high-school center Andrew Bynum, a decision his father needed to approve. Buss said, "I just absolutely fell in love with [Bynum] in five minutes [watching his workout]." He was also involved in rehiring Jackson as Lakers coach. Buss was the only family member present at Jackson's welcome-back news conference, which the Los Angeles Daily News wrote "was viewed as significant". Buss stuck with Bynum as he struggled with immaturity and injuries, and he withstood demands from Bryant that Bynum be traded.

After Jackson retired in 2011, Buss told coaching candidates Brian Shaw and Mike Brown that Bynum needed to receive the ball inside. Shaw was passed over as Jackson's replacement although the Lakers assistant was openly supported by players. Buss instead hired Brown without consulting their star player, Kobe Bryant. He later said it was a mistake to not involve Bryant. Shaw was not bitter that the Lakers went with Brown, but he was disappointed that after 12 years of service, they did not contact him until three weeks after their decision. The well-respected Shaw atypically criticized Buss in a radio interview over his treatment during the hiring cycle. The offseason also included the NBA player lockout, during which the Lakers let go of nearly two dozen employees with a combined 100 years of experience from the basketball operations staff. Assistant General Manager Ronnie Lester, whose contract was not renewed after 24 years with the team, said "great organizations don't treat their personnel like they've done." CBS Sports wrote that NBA executives are typically discreet, and Lester's public criticism "shows how strongly he feels the Lakers were in the wrong here". Buss feared the season would be cancelled, and said that "we had to do what we had to do. It's not fun; there's no question about that." The lockout ended in the winter of 2011.

Prior to the start of the 2011–12 season, Buss had a deal in place to acquire Chris Paul from the New Orleans Hornets for Pau Gasol and Lamar Odom, but NBA commissioner David Stern blocked the trade. That season, Brown expanded Bynum's role. The next season, the Lakers acquired Steve Nash and upgraded at center, trading Bynum for Dwight Howard. The acquisition of Howard appeared to be the start of a new dynasty for the Lakers. With their $100 million payroll, the Lakers were expected to be title contenders. Instead, Brown was fired after a 1–4 start; his dismissal after five games was the third-fastest coaching change in NBA history. In a unanimous decision by Buss, his father, and Mitch Kupchak, the Lakers decided against re-hiring Jackson and signed Mike D'Antoni instead. According to NBA.com, Jerry by that time was no longer involved in the Lakers' day-to-day affairs, and rarely exercised his veto powers. Buss, however, said his father continued to be "involved in every decision" in the final months of his life, and he chose D'Antoni. After being passed over in favor of Brown in 2011, Shaw said he was informed by Jerry that "his son is in control now, and he has to let him make whatever decisions that he makes." The 2012–13 season ended up being a disappointment, with Buss saying "we didn't get to realize the dream of four Hall of Famers on the same team."

After Jerry Buss died in 2013, his 66% controlling ownership of the Lakers passed to his six children via a trust, with each child receiving an equal vote. Jerry's succession plan had Jeanie assume his previous title as the Lakers' governor as well as its team representative at NBA Board of Governors meetings. After the season, the Lakers were unable to re-sign the free agent Howard, who joined the Houston Rockets while accepting $30 million less than the Lakers offer. Sister Jeanie commented that she "would be more comfortable [with her business relationship with Buss] if I understood what the [basketball] decision process was, and I'm not always involved in it." In 2013–14, Jeanie became Lakers president, and her role included overseeing the team's basketball operations while working with Buss, who continued as Lakers executive VP of basketball operations. Former Lakers player and part owner Magic Johnson, who was also close to Buss' father, believed that Buss needed to put aside his ego and seek assistance to help the Lakers recruit against rival teams for free agent players. That season, Buss signed Bryant to a two-year extension worth $48.5 million, even before Bryant had recovered from an Achilles tendon tear. The Los Angeles Times called the deal "one of many terrible Lakers moves" that year.

In January 2014, Buss pledged to his siblings that he would step down if the Lakers were not contending for the Western Conference championship in three to four years. According to Jeanie, she was holding him to his self-imposed deadline, and was expecting him to lead the Lakers to at least the second round of the playoffs by 2016–17. On February 21, 2017, Buss was fired as head of basketball operations of the Lakers, though he continued to be a part owner of the team. After a dispute with Jeanie over ownership of the team, he was removed as a trustee of the Buss family trust and lost his position on the Lakers board of directors. In 2025, the Buss family sold its majority stake in the Lakers to a group headed by Mark Walter at a team valuation of $10 billion. The Busses retained a 17.8% share of the team.

== Public image ==
Buss is introverted and avoids the spotlight, and has never joined any on-court public ceremony for the Lakers. He rarely spoke in public as a Lakers executive, while general manager Mitch Kupchak usually handled the speaking responsibilities regarding player personnel. Buss is sometimes portrayed in the Los Angeles media as a slacker with his father's tastes but without his business savvy. In 2013, Buss said the playboy image stemmed from his clubbing with his dad 30 years earlier, but stated that he became a "stay-at-home guy. That's where I like to work."

Public perception is that Buss was instrumental in distancing the team from Jackson, including discounting his assistant Shaw from succeeding him as Lakers head coach. During his interview for the position, Shaw said he had to defend Jackson when Buss spoke negatively of their former coach. In a May 2011 interview, Jackson said "there's really not a relationship" with him and Buss. However, Buss in 2013 denied the perception of his relationship with Jackson. "I have zero problem with Phil, and Phil has zero problem with me." Buss said he would be fine if Jackson, who at the time was engaged to Buss' sister Jeanie, was on the Lakers' payroll, but only as a consultant. According to Jeanie, Jackson served as an unofficial consultant: "Phil is a part of the organization because of me ... Jim and Mitch know Phil is a phone call away." Kupchak confirmed that he had interacted with Jackson on unspecified team issues. However, Jackson did not envision a role on the team unless there was "some seismic shift" in the organization. Jeanie also said the Lakers were "in good hands" with Buss and Kupchak in their current roles. The Orange County Register, though, wrote that "many fans would love to imagine" Jackson returning to the Lakers to replace Buss as the leader of basketball operations, and teaming with Jeanie to build a championship team. In 2014, public pressure mounted on the Buss family to hire Jackson, as he was discussing a front office position with the New York Knicks. However, the Lakers did not have a suitable front office role to offer him, and Jackson joined the Knicks as their president of basketball operations.

== Personal life ==
Buss married in 1983, and the couple adopted a son, Jager. Buss and his wife separated months later, but continued living together for six months while a social worker was monitoring the adoption. They divorced in late 1985 with Buss gaining sole custody of their son.
