= Johnny Buss =

American sports executive (born 1956)

- Born: Johnny Hatten Buss; October 18, 1956 (age 69); Inglewood, California, U.S.
- Occupation: Part owner of the Los Angeles Lakers
- Political party: Independent
- Spouse: Christy Curtis
- Parent: Jerry Buss

Johnny Hatten Buss (born October 18, 1956) is an American sports executive who is a part-owner of the Los Angeles Lakers of the National Basketball Association (NBA). He previously held positions as president of the Los Angeles Lazers professional indoor soccer team and the Los Angeles Sparks professional women's basketball team. He is the oldest son of the late Lakers owner Jerry Buss.

== Early life ==
Buss was born in Inglewood, California, to JoAnn and Jerry Buss. Their oldest son, he was raised with his brother Jim and sisters Jeanie and Janie. Buss's parents divorced when he was 12. He attended Pacific Palisades High School in Los Angeles. He quit the school football team after two plays on the first day of tryouts and was forced off their gymnastics team for not cutting his hair. Expelled from school for cutting class, Buss finished at a different school. He enrolled at Santa Monica College, but skipped classes there too. Later, he attended the University of Southern California, where he studied in the drama department.

== Professional career ==
Buss was managing a real estate company in Las Vegas when his father appointed him in 1982 to run the Los Angeles Lazers of the Major Indoor Soccer League (MISL). With the team facing financial difficulties, he resigned after three seasons following the 1984 season. Buss began racing Formula Three cars. He wanted a million-dollar race car, but his father refused to pay for it, not wanting his son to race at the higher speeds. When the Women's National Basketball Association (WNBA) was founded in 1996, Buss's father appointed him as president of the Los Angeles Sparks. The team won WNBA championships in 2001 and 2002. After reaching the playoffs in each subsequent season, Buss resigned in 2006. Buss would say he was feeling exhausted with the managerial tasks, and when announcing to his father he no longer had the heart in working there, Jerry agreed to sell the Sparks. He started a social networking site for artists, Musester.com.

By 2013, Buss was the Los Angeles Lakers' executive vice president of strategic development. His father died that year, and his 66% controlling ownership of the Lakers passed to six of his children via four trusts, the Buss Family Trusts, with each child receiving an equal interest. In addition to Buss and his siblings Jim, Jeanie, and Janie, the other heirs were their half-brothers—Joey and Jesse—from an ex-girlfriend of their father. Buss, Jim and Jeanie were named the three trustees.

On February 21, 2017, Jeanie, the Lakers' president, fired Jim as president of basketball operations. Buss thought that his brother should have been reassigned privately instead of a public firing. In a letter from Buss three days later, Jeanie was informed that he and Jim were proposing a Lakers' board of directors that did not include her. She responded by filing a temporary restraining order and suing her brothers for breaching their duties as trustees. After the brothers' proposal failed, Buss resigned from the team, and he and Jim resigned as co-trustees, replaced by Janie and Joey. In 2025, the Buss family sold its majority stake in the Lakers to a group headed by Mark Walter at a team valuation of $10 billion. The Busses retained a 17.8% share of the team.

In 2019, Buss bought The Ice House comedy club in Pasadena, California, one of the oldest comedy clubs in the country. A few months after his purchase, the club closed due to the COVID-19 pandemic. Buss took the opportunity to renovate the club, which re-opened in 2023 after a three-year hiatus and $4 million overhaul.

== Political career ==
In 2024, Buss announced his campaign as an independent candidate in the U.S. presidential election.

== Personal life ==
Buss married his girlfriend in 1990, before separating two days after; they were divorced a year later. Around 1991, he married Los Angeles Clippers cheerleader Christy Curtis. They were separated by 2012.

Buss met his older sister around 2019. His parents had put her up for adoption after birth, and she later searched her roots.
