= Hermann Busse (politician) =

German politician (1903–1970)

Member of the Bundestag
- In office 17 October 1961 – 19 October 1969

Personal details
- Born: 23 November 1903 Lübbecke
- Died: 27 January 1970 (aged 66)
- Party: FDP

Hermann Busse (23 November 1903 – 27 January 1970) was a German politician of the Free Democratic Party (FDP) and former member of the German Bundestag.

== Life ==
Busse had been a council member of the city of Herford since 1952. From 1961 to 1969 he was a member of the German Bundestag. He had entered parliament via the state list of the FDP North Rhine-Westphalia.

== Literature ==
Herbst, Ludolf; Jahn, Bruno (2002). Vierhaus, Rudolf (ed.). Biographisches Handbuch der Mitglieder des Deutschen Bundestages. 1949–2002 [Biographical Handbook of the Members of the German Bundestag. 1949–2002] (in German). München: De Gruyter - De Gruyter Saur. p. 1715. ISBN 978-3-11-184511-1.
