= Buss Island =

Phantom island in the Atlantic Ocean

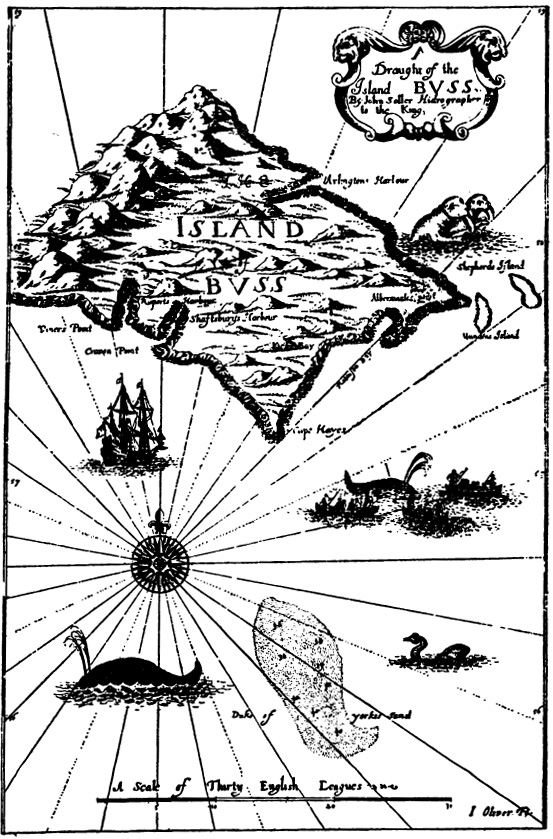
- Buss Island map from John Seller's "English Pilot"
- Created by: Martin Frobisher

In-universe information
- Type: Phantom island

Bus island, central on the map on a 1786 Dutch map

Bus, Buss, or Busse Island was a phantom island in the North Atlantic Ocean. It was recorded as discovered during the third expedition of Martin Frobisher in September 1578 by sailors aboard the ship Emanuel of Bridgwater (a "busse") and was indicated on maps as existing between Ireland and mythical Frisland at about 57° N. The island was then named for the type of vessel that its discoverers used. It is believed that Frobisher took Greenland for Frisland and Baffin Island for Greenland and Emanuel, returning home, made a mistake in dead reckoning and mistook optical effects near Greenland at around 62° N for new land.

A Thomas Shepard claimed to have explored and mapped the island from Golden Lion of Dunkirk in 1671. As Atlantic traffic increased, the island's existence was less certain and its supposed size was greatly reduced. By 1745, it was apparent there was no island at the site claimed and it was renamed the Sunken Land of Buss, as the supposed area was relatively shallow. The island or 'site of sunken island' persisted on charts into the 19th century. Its existence at the location was finally disproved by John Ross in Isabella in 1818 during his first Arctic expedition, finding no depth at 180 fathoms (330 m).

== See also ==
- Azores (real island group in the mid-atlantic)
