= Jerry Buss =

American businessman and investor (1933–2013)

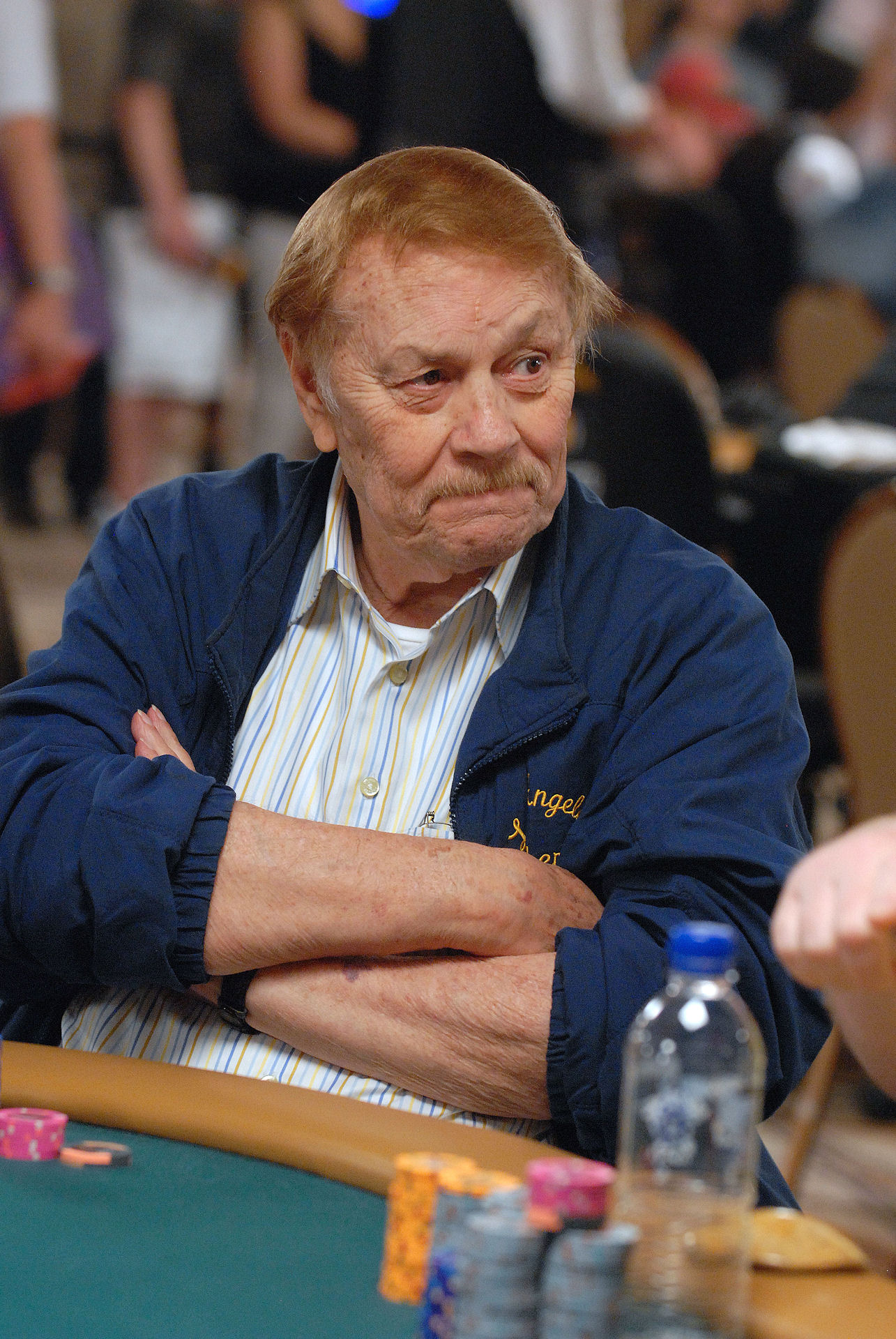
- Buss at the 2009 World Series of Poker
- Born: Gerald Hatten Buss; January 27, 1933; Salt Lake City, Utah, U.S.
- Died: February 18, 2013 (aged 80); Los Angeles, California, U.S.
- Resting place: Forest Lawn Memorial Park, Los Angeles, California
- Education: University of Wyoming (BS); University of Southern California (MS, PhD)
- Occupations: Businessman; investor; chemist; poker player; philanthropist
- Known for: Owner of the Los Angeles Lakers and Los Angeles Sparks
- Spouse: JoAnn Mueller (m. 1952; div. 1972)
- Partner(s): Veronica Hoff (1972–1980); Karen Demel
- Children: 7, including Johnny, Jim, Jeanie and Jesse
- Awards: 10× NBA champion (as owner) 1980, 1982, 1985, 1987, 1988, 2000, 2001, 2002, 2009, 2010 with Lakers; 2× WNBA champion (as owner) 2001, 2002 with Sparks; Naismith Memorial Basketball HOF (Class of 2010)

Gerald Hatten Buss (January 27, 1933 – February 18, 2013) was an American businessman, investor, chemist, and philanthropist. He was the majority owner of the Los Angeles Lakers of the National Basketball Association (NBA), winning 10 league championships that were highlighted by the team's Showtime era during the 1980s. He was inducted into the Naismith Memorial Basketball Hall of Fame as a contributor. Buss owned other professional sports franchises in Southern California.

== Early life and business career ==
Born in Salt Lake City, Buss and his three younger siblings were raised by their divorced mother, Jessie, who worked as a waitress. His father, Lydus, was an accountant who went on to teach statistics at Berkeley, who abandoned Buss after his first birthday and never returned. When he was nine years old, Buss moved with his mother to Los Angeles; three years later when she remarried, they then moved to Kemmerer, Wyoming and lived in a six-room home with his half-brother Mickey, his half-sister Susan, and stepbrother Jim. One of Buss' boyhood jobs was working for his stepfather, Cecil Brown, who owned a plumbing business. Other jobs in Buss' high school days included carrying bags at the Kemmerer Hotel (paid $2 per day (~$24.08 as of 2025), setting pins at the bowling alley, working on the Union Pacific Railroad, selling stamps, and shining shoes.

Buss earned a scholarship to the University of Wyoming, graduating with a BS degree in two and a half years in 1953. He then returned to Los Angeles and attended the University of Southern California (USC), where he earned an MS and PhD in physical chemistry in 1957 at the age of 24. Upon completion of his PhD, Buss moved to Boston and worked for Arthur D. Little. Buss started as a chemist for the Bureau of Mines (now the Mine Safety and Health Administration); he then briefly worked in the aerospace industry for McDonnell Douglas and was on the faculty of USC's chemistry department.

Buss originally invested in real estate to provide supplementary income so he could continue teaching. His first investment was $1,000 in a 14-unit West Los Angeles apartment building in 1959. Finding great success in the real estate business, he, along with longtime business partner, Frank Mariani, formed real estate investment company Mariani-Buss Associates. In 1979, Buss purchased Pickfair, the Beverly Hills estate once owned by Mary Pickford and Douglas Fairbanks; he sold it in 1987. Buss claimed his company owned—across Arizona, California and Nevada—roughly 700 properties by 1979.

In 1974, Buss produced a movie named Black Eye starring former gridiron star Fred "the Hammer" Williamson.

Buss was an owner of the Phoenix location of the Playboy Club.

=== Sports team ownership ===
Buss became an owner of the Los Angeles Strings in World Team Tennis. On May 29, 1979, he purchased the Los Angeles Lakers of the NBA, the Los Angeles Kings of the NHL, The Forum, and a 13,000-acre ranch in the Sierra Nevada from Jack Kent Cooke for $67.5 million (equivalent to $300 million in 2025). Buss later sold his controlling interest in the Kings to Bruce McNall in 1988. He then reached a major advertising agreement with Great Western Bank for the naming rights to The Forum, resulting in the official name of the building being changed to the Great Western Forum.

Later, when the WNBA was formed in 1996, Buss took charge of operating that league's Los Angeles franchise, the Los Angeles Sparks. Eventually, all three teams moved into a more modern arena in downtown Los Angeles, the Staples Center, which opened in 1999. As part of the deal to move the Lakers into Staples Center, Buss sold the Great Western Forum (which was later reverted to its original name).

The Lakers were very successful under Buss' ownership, winning 10 NBA championships with such players as Kareem Abdul-Jabbar, Magic Johnson, James Worthy, Shaquille O'Neal, Kobe Bryant, and Pau Gasol, and with coaches Paul Westhead, Pat Riley and Phil Jackson. He inspired the Lakers' Showtime era with his vision that basketball games must be entertaining. The Sparks also experienced their share of success, winning two WNBA championships with such players as Lisa Leslie, Tamecka Dixon and DeLisha Milton-Jones.

In 2002, when the WNBA was restructured to give its teams individual owners, Buss took ownership of the Sparks. He sold the team in 2006. Buss also owned the Los Angeles Lazers of the Major Indoor Soccer League. The Lazers also played in The Forum. The team folded in 1989 and the league folded three years later.

His contributions to basketball were recognized by his induction into the Basketball Hall of Fame in 2010. Buss received the Golden Plate Award from the American Academy of Achievement in 1983.

== Philanthropy ==
In January 2008, Buss donated $7.5 million to USC's Department of Chemistry to fund two endowed chairs and an endowed scholarship fund for chemistry graduate students; the two chairs were to be named after his mentors at USC, Professors Sidney Benson and David Dows. Buss was an inaugural member of the USC College Board of Councilors.

His philanthropy also extended to people associated with the Lakers. When former Lakers player Walt Hazzard, then an adviser to the team, suffered a catastrophic stroke in 1996, Buss kept Hazzard on the payroll and told Hazzard's son that his father would remain a Lakers employee for as long as Buss owned the team. When Hazzard died in 2011, he was still a Lakers employee.

== Personal life ==
Buss has seven known children. His marriage to JoAnn Mueller ended in divorce in 1972 after having five children: Lee (born 1953), Johnny (born 1956), Jim (born 1959), Jeanie (born 1961) and Janie (born 1963). Their oldest child, Lee, was put up for adoption shortly after birth, and did not reunite with her mother and siblings until after Buss's death. Buss allegedly married his second wife, Veronica Hoff, in 1972 while still married to his first wife, JoAnn. During his time as Lakers owner, Buss was widely known as a playboy and had a string of young girlfriends. Buss dated Debbie Zafrani, a Playboy bunny and the younger sister of the wife of Lakers player Kurt Rambis.

Buss had two more children with a girlfriend, Karen Demel: Joey (born 1985) and Jesse (born 1988). At the time of his death in 2013, six out of seven of his children worked in the Lakers organization.

In 1990, Buss reached a settlement out of court in a palimony suit filed by Puppi Buss, who said that she had an on-and-off relationship with Buss for 15 years, and also alleged that he fathered her son; details of the settlement were not revealed.

On May 29, 2007, Buss was issued a citation for driving under the influence after two California Highway Patrol officers saw him driving his gold Mercedes-Benz on the wrong side of the road in the coastal community of Carlsbad in northern San Diego County, with a 23-year-old woman passenger. After failing a field sobriety test, Buss was taken into custody, given a blood test, and booked on suspicion of driving while intoxicated with a blood-alcohol level over 0.08.

Buss was a high-stakes cash game poker player for many years, but later in life was more active in tournament games. His best finishes included third in the 1991 World Series of Poker seven-card stud event and second place in the 2003 World Poker Tour Freeroll invitational. He also appeared in the GSN series High Stakes Poker and the NBC late-night series Poker After Dark.

Buss began collecting coins when he was 10 in Los Angeles. During his life, he acquired three rare US coins: a 1913 Liberty Head nickel, an 1894-S Barber dime, and an 1804 dollar. He sold his collection at auction in 1985.

Beginning in the early 1980s, Jerry Buss was seen in and around Los Angeles at charitable events with a group of close friends who were dubbed in the press as “The Seven Dwarfs”. This group included Jerry's personal friends John Rockwell, Ron and David Wilder, Miguel A. Nunez, Lance Davis, Mark Fulton, and Brian J. Sadler. The Seven Dwarfs would often bid on charitable auction items that would help the causes of the events they attended. The Dwarfs were gifted championship rings when the Lakers won titles and were granted access to all Laker home games and events at the Fabulous Forum / Great Western Forum / Staples Center. Professionally, The Dwarfs positions included special assistant, financial advisor, investment banker, and ADPAC marketing executive. The Dwarfs were regular fixtures in and among the Showtime Lakers throughout the 1980s and 1990s, and until Jerry’s passing in 2013.

== Death ==
In 2012, Buss was in a hospital for months with an undisclosed intestinal problem. Through his 80th birthday on January 27, 2013, he had not attended a Lakers game during the 2012–13 season due to health concerns. On February 14, 2013, four days before his death, it was revealed that Buss had cancer since 2012.

After being hospitalized at Cedars-Sinai Medical Center with an undisclosed form of cancer, he died of kidney failure on February 18, 2013, aged 80. On February 21, hundreds of friends, colleagues, and family members gathered to pay tribute to Buss in a televised memorial service at the Nokia Theatre L.A. Live, across from the Lakers' home court, Staples Center. Buss was buried on February 22 at Forest Lawn Memorial Park in Hollywood Hills in a private ceremony with family and close friends.

NBA commissioner David Stern said of Buss "The NBA has lost a visionary owner whose influence on our league is incalculable and will be felt for decades to come". Lakers guard Kobe Bryant said "His impact is felt worldwide," and called Buss "the greatest owner in sports ever".

Buss's 66% controlling ownership of the Lakers passed to his six children (Johnny, Jim, Jeanie, Janie, Joey, and Jesse) via a trust, with each child receiving an equal vote (11% for each child). His succession plan had daughter Jeanie assume his previous title as the Lakers' governor as well as its team representative at NBA Board of Governors meetings.

The 2013 World Series of Poker paid tribute to Buss before the $2,500 Seven Card Stud event.

Sporting positions
Preceded by Jack Kent Cooke	Los Angeles Lakers principal owner 1979–2013	Succeeded by Buss Family Trust (Jeanie Buss)
Preceded by Jack Kent Cooke	Los Angeles Kings principal owner 1979–1988	Succeeded by Bruce McNall
