= Lech Polcyn =

Polish artist (born 1964)

- Born: 30 September 1964 (age 61); Białystok
- Citizenship: Polish
- Education: Jan Matejko Academy of Fine Arts
- Known for: graphics, photography, painting

Lech Polcyn (born 30 September 1964) is a Polish graphic artist, photographer and painter, professor at the Academy of Fine Arts in Kraków.

== Biography ==
He attended the public highschool of fine arts in Supraśl (1979–1984) and the Faculty of Graphic Arts of the Academy of Fine Arts in Kraków (1985–1990), graduating with honors from the studio of Stanisław Wejman. He also studied under Zbigniew Łagocki.

In 1990, he was employed as an academic teacher at the Academy of Fine Arts in Kraków, at the Department of Photography. There, from 1995 he was an assistant at the studio of Zbigniew Zegan, teaching photography. From 1998, he headed the photography studio in collaboration with Agata Pankiewicz. In 1997 he collaborated as a photography assistant with Deborah Turbeville on her album Cantor Theater. Between 1995 and 2006 he took commercial commissions as a photographer. (Note: Including for brands: Umbro, Zelmer, Vistula, Wólczanka, Pliva, Ahold, Tefal, Agmet, Ardo, Rowenta, Silica, Kael, Baltic Floor, Cersanit, Polish State Railways.)

Since 1991, he has shown his works at various individual and group exhibitions in Poland and other countries, including in the US, France, Germany, Switzerland, Austria, Finland, Sweden, Slovakia and Hungary; receiving various accolades. He participated in exhibitions held, among others, at the Museum of the History of Photography in Kraków, the MOCAK Museum of Contemporary Art, the BWA Art Gallery in Katowice, BWA Art Gallery in Tarnów, Królikarnia and Starmach Gallery.

He obtained a Ph.D. in fine arts at the Academy of Fine Arts in Kraków, at the Faculty of Graphic Arts in 2009. In that same year he took the lead of the studio of digital photography (No.3) at the Department of Animated Film, Photography and Digital Media of the Academy of Fine Arts in Kraków. In 2010 he obtained the degree of assistant professor, and then associate professor at the Faculty of Graphic Arts of the Academy of Fine Arts in Kraków. Since 2012, he has been a lecturer at the Institute of Art of the State Higher Vocational School in Tarnów, where he also holds the position of associate professor. In 2015, at the Academy of Fine Arts in Kraków, he obtained habilitation, a postdoctoral degree equivalent with tenure. In 2019, he became a member of the Expert Committee of the Polish Accreditation Committee.

In 2011–2020, he granted a free Creative Commons license to post twelve photographs of Polish scientists on Wikipedia. (Note: These included the portraits of: Jerzy Vetulani, Andrzej Szczeklik, Aleksander Koj, Jerzy Stachura, Włodzimierz Ptak, Stanisław Konturek, Ryszard Gryglewski, Edmund Przegaliński, Jacek Pietrzyk, Jerzy Maj, Marek Zembala, Włodzimierz Ostrowski.)

== Art work ==
Lech Polcyn is active in the fields of fine-art photography (portrait, self-portrait, nude), painting, graphic arts and graphic design.

One of the themes in his work, according to critic Agnieszka Gniotek, is the “chaotic reality” of the artist, shown in an intimate presentation; the chaos is supposed to “prevail over the attempt to organize everyday life”. The artist's interests include “everyday objects, situations and feelings between two people, private stories and home chronicles”.

Initially, Lech Polcyn created still lifes and portraits. In subsequent stages, his work evolved towards “ever greater generalizations, building the plane of the canvas with a clearly marked outline and a specific color spot, excluding modeling and chiaroscuro”. The form and the color palette of his works were simplified more and more. The artist eventually “lost color”, creating compositions using a subdued palette, or “almost monochromatic”.

As a consequence of further simplifications, Lech Polcyn started the stage of dividing the composition into smaller fragments. Fragmentation acquired a spatial dimension, leading to the creation of photographic objects “as a result of tearing barite prints, transforming them into a photographic plywood, soaked in glue and formed or stitched to take the shape of real objects or body parts”, which Polcyn entitled “objects of reality”.

== Exhibitions and awards ==
Individual exhibitions

- Ideogramy rzeczywistości, clubOKOcafe, Krakow Photomonth, 2003;
- Alegorie postmodernizmu, Galerie Daniel Martinez, Munich, 2004;
- Portrety-maski, Galeria PAcamera, Suwałki, 2004;
- Fragmentacja – defragmentacja, Galeria Ars Nova, Łódź, 2006;
- per/mutacje, Galerie Sandhofer, Innsbruck, 2007;
- Obrazy, Pharmacy Museum of the Jagiellonian University Medical College, Kraków, 2011;
- Przedmioty nie/rzeczywiste, BWA Art Gallery in Tarnów, Pałacyk Strzelecki, 2014;
- Przedmioty nie/rzeczywiste 2, Solvay Centre for Modern Art, Kraków, 2017;
- "foto\grafika", Academy of Fine Arts in Kraków, Faculty of Graphic Arts, 2018;
- Poprzez Wszechświat, Międzynarodowe Centrum Sztuk Graficznych w Krakowie, 2024;
- Po za granicą trójwymiaru, Galeria Rogatka in Radom, 2025.

Group exhibitions

- IX Konfrontacje `91, Myślenice – Distinction, 1991;
- Fotoforum, Ružomberok – Gold Medal of the Fédération Internationale de l'Art Photographique, 1993;
- V Grand Prix Photographique du Grand Passage, Geneva, 1994;
- Portret Miasta – Kraków – Grand Prix, 1995;
- XXV Gorzowskie Konfrontacje Fotograficzne, Gorzów Wielkopolski – First Prize, 1995;
- Hasselblad-Austrian Super Circuit, Linz – VŐAV Gold Medal, PSA Linz Gold Medal, 1996;
- Idea `97, I Ogólnopolski Przegląd Wydawnictw Reklamowych, Toruń – Distinction;
- On i Oni, Museum of the History of Photography, Kraków, 1998; (Note: Exhibition of works by Zbigniew Łagocki and his students.)
- II Ogólnopolskie Biennale Pasteli, Nowy Sącz – Second Prize, 1998;
- XXVIII Gorzowskie Konfrontacje Fotograficzne, Gorzów Wielkopolski – Honorary Diploma of the Artistic Council of the Association of Polish Art Photographers, 1998;
- Ogólnopolskie Biennale Pasteli, Nowy Sącz – Award of the Association of Polish Artists and Designers – Kraków Branch, 2000;
- 18 Festiwal Polskiego Malarstwa Współczesnego, Szczecin, 2000;
- 4 Triennale Grafiki Polskiej, BWA Art Gallery in Katowice, 2000;
- Sacrum – Dzisiaj II, Zieliński Palace, Kielce – Second Prize, (Note: The First Prize was not awarded.) 2001;
- Obraz Roku, Królikarnia, Warsaw, 2002;
- I Międzynarodowe Biennale Pasteli – Distinction, Nowy Sącz, 2003;
- Over view, Galerie Daniel Martinez, Munich, 2003;
- Some Like It Hot, Vernissage & Bloxham Galleries, London, 2003;
- Triennale z Martwą Naturą, BWA Art Gallery in Sieradz – Art & Business Magazine Award, 2003;
- International Print Triennial, Kraków, 2004;
- Targi Sztuki ST'art, Strasbourg, 2005;
- 6 Triennale Grafiki Polskiej, BWA Art Gallery in Katowice, 2006;
- Targi Sztuki, Innsbruck, 2008;
- Biennale Grafiki Cyfrowej Gdynia, City Museum of Gdynia, 2008;
- Materia medicinalis, materia artificialis – Award of the Director of the Museum of Pharmacy for painting Hygieia, Kraków, 2011;
- Fotografia, ślady czasu i emocji, Galerie Roi Dore, Paris, 2013;
- Ex Digitalis Salon, Centre of Contemporary Art in Toruń, Labsen, 2015;
- Inspiracje architekturą, Academy of Fine Arts in Kraków, Promotional Gallery, 2016;
- Rzeczy. Przedmiot i obiekt w polskiej fotografii, Starmach Gallery, Kraków Photomonth, 2017;
- Bielska Jesień, Bielsko Biała, 2017;
- Ciało pedagogiczne, train station in Tarnów, 2018;
- Transgrafia, Fundacja Tytano, former tobacco factory in Kraków, 2018;
- Rzeczy i ludzie, BWA Art Gallery in Tarnów, 2019;
- Artyści z Krakowa. Generacja 1950–1969, MOCAK Museum of Contemporary Art, 2020;
- 25. Międzynarodowy Wschodni Salon Sztuki, Centrum Spotkania Kultur, Lublin, 2020;
- Transgrafia 2.0. Sztuka jest przestrzenią wolności, Unity Tower, International Print Triennial, Kraków, 2021;
- Cyfrowe konfrontacje, Wielka Zbrojownia in Gdańsk, 2022;
- Czasoprzestrzenie graficzne, Muzeum Akademii Sztuk Pięknych im. Jana Matejki w Krakowie, 2023;
- Momentum, Międzynarodowe Triennale Grafiki w Krakowie, Nowohuckie Centrum Kultury, 2024;
- 12 wystawa grafiki Członków Stowarzyszenia Międzynarodowe Triennale Grafiki w Krakowie, Międzynarodowe Centrum Sztuk Graficznych w Krakowie, 2025;
- 8. Międzynarodowe Triennale Grafiki Cyfrowej, Galeria BWA w Rzeszowie, 2025;
- 13 wystawa grafiki Członków Stowarzyszenia Międzynarodowe Triennale Grafiki w Krakowie, Międzynarodowe Centrum Sztuk Graficznych w Krakowie, 2026;
- Common Multiple. European Graphic Prints – From Old Masters to Contemporary Endeavours, Hungarian Art & Business, Budapest, 2026.

== Distinctions ==
- Silver Medal for Long Service (2015)
