= Jaworowski =

Jaworowski is a surname of Polish origin. Notable people with the surname include:

- Jan Jaworowski (1928 - 2013), Polish and American mathematician
- Leo Jaworowski (1764 - 1833), Belarusian bishop
- Zbigniew Jaworowski (1927 - 2011), Polish physician
