= Theodosius Wislocki =

Theodosius Wislocki (Polish: Teodozy Wisłocki; 23 February 1738 – 28 April 1801) was a bishop of the Ruthenian Uniate Church, Bishop of Suprasl and all unites in New East Prussia.

After the third partition of Poland, on initiative of Theodosius Rostocki in 1778 Wislocki was appointed administrator of newly created Suprasl diocese (eparchy) which became part of the Prussian province of New East Prussia. It was not until 1800 when he was finally ordained on 27 April by Jesuit bishop John Baptist Albertrandi.

== See also ==
- Supraśl Orthodox Monastery

Catholic Church titles
| New title | Administrator of Suprasl Eparchy; 1778 – 1800 | Succeeded by himself as bishop |
| New title | Bishop of Suprasl; 1800 – 1801 | Succeeded by Nicholas Duchnowski |
