= Nicholas Duchnowski =

Bishop of all units in New East Prussia

Nicholas Duchnowski (Polish: Mikołaj Duchnowski; 12 December 1733 – 25 June 1805) was a bishop of the Ruthenian Uniate Church, Bishop of Supraśl and all unites in New East Prussia.

After the death of Theodosius Wislocki, Nicholas Duchnowski was selected as the locum tenens bishop of Supraśl until he was consecrated in 1804.

== See also ==
- Supraśl Orthodox Monastery

Catholic Church titles
Preceded by Theodosius Wislocki	Bishop of Suprasl (locum); 1801 – 1804	Succeeded by himself as bishop
Preceded by Theodosius Wislocki	Bishop of Suprasl; 1804 – 1805	Succeeded by Leo Jaworowski
