= Codex Suprasliensis =

10th-century Cyrillic literary monument

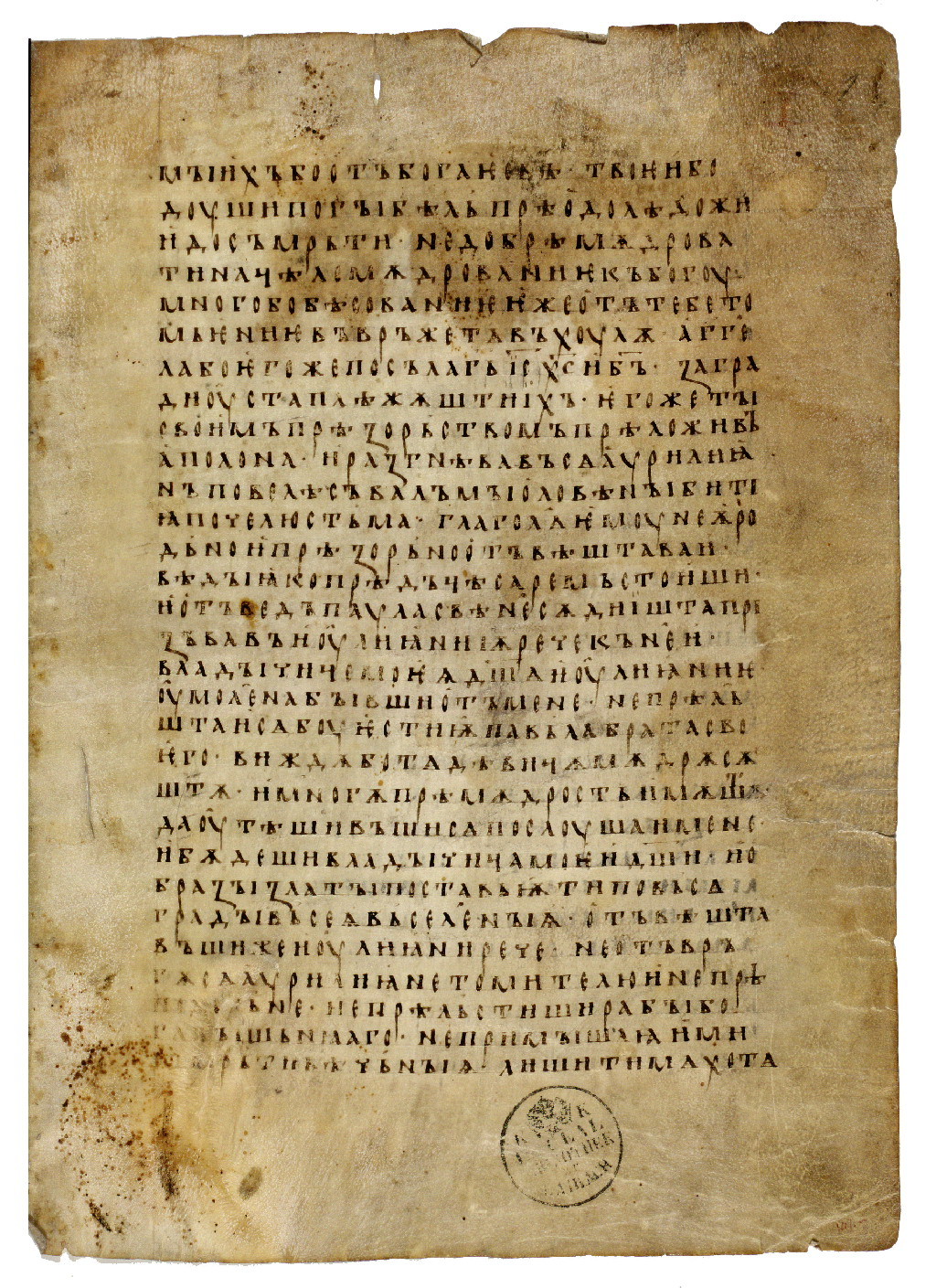
- A leaf of the codex
- Created: 10th century in Bulgaria
- Discovered: 1823; Supraśl Orthodox Monastery
- Place: Supraśl, Poland
- Present location: National and University Library of Slovenia
- Language: Old Church Slavonic

The Codex Suprasliensis is a 10th-century Cyrillic literary monument, the largest extant Old Church Slavonic canon manuscript and the oldest Slavic literary work located in Poland. As of September 20, 2007, it is on UNESCO's Memory of the World list.

== Description ==
The codex, written in Medieval Bulgaria at the end or even in the middle of the 10th century, contains a menaion for the month of March, intersecting with the movable cycle of Easter. It also contains 24 lives of saints, 23 homilies and one prayer, most of which were written by or are attributed to John Chrysostom. The 284-folio (or 285-folio, according to some sources) codex was "discovered" in 1823 by Canon Michał Bobrowski in the Uniate Basilian monastery in Supraśl.

In 1838, Bobrowski sent the last part of the manuscript in two pieces to Slovene philologist Jernej Kopitar so that he could transcribe it. After Kopitar returned it, Bobrowski sent him the first part (118 folios), however for unknown reasons it was never returned to Bobrowski and was found in 1845 among the documents of the deceased Kopitar. It was later kept by the Ljubljana Lyceum and now by the National and University Library of Slovenia in Ljubljana.

The largest part was bought for the private library of the Zamoyski family in Warsaw. This part of the codex disappeared during World War II, but later resurfaced in the United States and was returned by Herbert Moeller to Poland in 1968, where it has been held by the National Library of Poland in Warsaw until the present day. The third part, consisting of 16 folios, is held by the Russian National Library in Saint Petersburg.

The codex was published by Franz Miklosich (Vienna, 1851), Sergej Severjanov (Suprasalьskaja rukopisь, Saint Petersburg, 1904), and Jordan Zaimov and Mario Capaldo (Sophia, 1982–1983). Alfons Margulies produced a significant volume on the codex titled Der altkirchenslavische Codex Suprasliensis (Heidelberg, 1927).

Folio 260 of the manuscript contains the note g(ospod)i pomilui retъka amin. Some experts think retъka represents the name of a scribe (hence the occasional name Codex of Retko) and that the text was copied from several sources. Research indicates that at least one of the sources may have Glagolitic (for Epiphanius' Homily on the Entombment). Vocalizations of yers, rarely occurring epenthesis, change of ъ to ь behind hardened č, ž, š and some other linguistic traits point to its (Eastern) Bulgarian linguistic provenance.

From May 2024, the part held by National Library of Poland is presented at the permanent exhibition in the Palace of the Commonwealth in Warsaw.

== See also ==
- Freising Manuscripts

== Sources ==
- Заимов, Й.; Капалдо, М. (1983). Супрасълски или Ретков сборник (in Bulgarian). Vol. 1, 2. Sofia.
- Damjanović, Stjepan (2004). Slovo iskona. Zagreb: Matica hrvatska. ISBN 953-150-567-5.
- Makowski, Tomasz; Sapała, Patryk, eds. (2024). The Palace of the Commonwealth. Three times opened. Treasures from the National Library of Poland at the Palace of the Commonwealth. Warsaw: National Library of Poland.
- Schenker, Alexander (1995). The Dawn of Slavic: An Introduction to Slavic Philology. New Haven: Yale University Press. ISBN 0-300-05846-2.
