= John Baptist Albertrandi =

Polish Jesuit and bishop

John Baptist Albertrandi SJ
- Titular bishop of Zenopolis
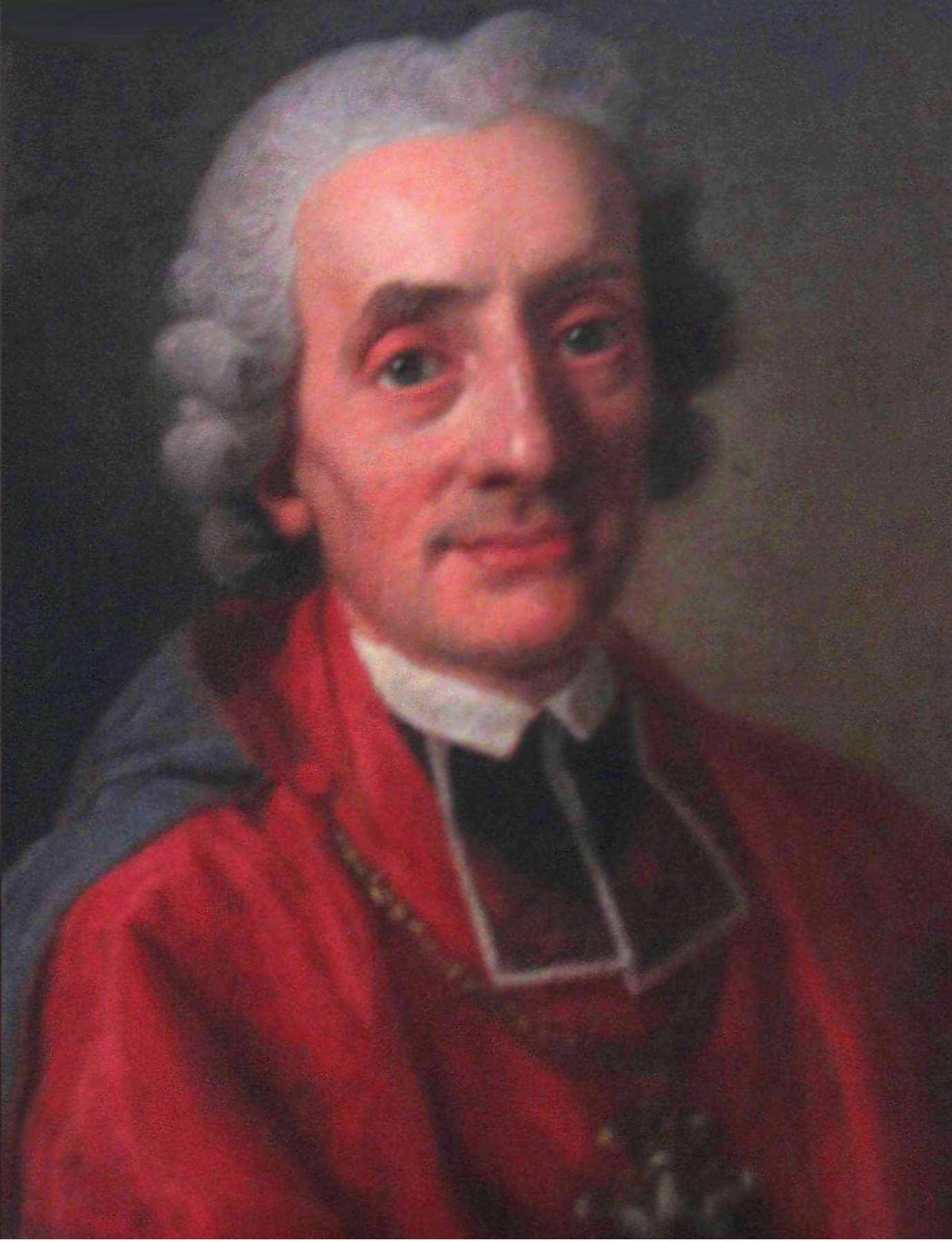
- Term ended: 1808

Personal details
- Born: December 7, 1731 Warsaw, Kingdom of Poland, Polish–Lithuanian Commonwealth
- Died: August 10, 1808 (aged 76) Warsaw, Duchy of Warsaw

John Baptist Albertrandi (Polish: Jan Chrzciciel Albertrandi; 7 December 1731 – 10 August 1808) was a Polish Jesuit, bishop and historian of Italian extraction, born in Warsaw.

== Biography ==
He entered the novitiate of the Society of Jesus, 14 August 1748, and left the Society shortly before the suppression, probably in 1769, for his name is not found in the catalog of 1770. After teaching literature for twelve years in the various Jesuit colleges in Poland, he was entrusted with the care of the great library founded by the Zaluski brothers Andrzej and Józef, prelates and litterateurs, who had revived literature in Poland.

This library which they bequeathed to the Poland-Lithuania Commonwealth was seized by Russia and later formed the nucleus of the Russian Imperial Library. Subsequently Albertrandi accepted the charge of preceptor to the nephew of the Primate, Archbishop Lubieński. With his pupil, Feliks Łubieński, who afterwards became Minister of Justice in Poland, he travelled through the various countries of Europe, chiefly Italy, to gather material for a great history of Poland.

With his own hand he copied manuscripts referring to Poland and Lithuania wherever he found them and in three years amassed a collection of one hundred and ten folio volumes. Where he was not allowed to copy he read and, on returning home in the evening, wrote out what his prodigious memory retained. Carlos Sommervogel says that the net result was two hundred folio volumes. Due to his contributions he is sometimes referred to as the "Polish Polyhistor".

His style is rapid, orderly, and methodical. He knew Greek, Latin, Hebrew, and most of the European languages. His published works are: Two volumes of a translation of Philippe Macquer's Annales Romaines; and abridged "Annals of Poland"; a great number of articles in the "Moniteur", a journal of Warsaw. He also collaborated with Adam Naruszewicz in a periodical called "Agreeable and Useful Recreations", and produced a work on numismatics, besides many discourses for the Academy of Warsaw, which he founded.

=== Last years ===
After the dissolution of the Society of Jesus, he became Royal Librarian, was appointed Bishop to the titular see of Zenopolis, and was decorated with the order of St. Stanislaus. In his work in the Royal library, he not only published a catalogue in ten volumes octavo, but left critical remarks in each of the books. He also had ready for publication manuscripts on the history of the three last centuries of Poland, explained by medals, Polish annals up to the reign of Władysław IV, and a "History of Stephen Bathory".

== See also ==
- Theodosius Wislocki
