= Supraśl =

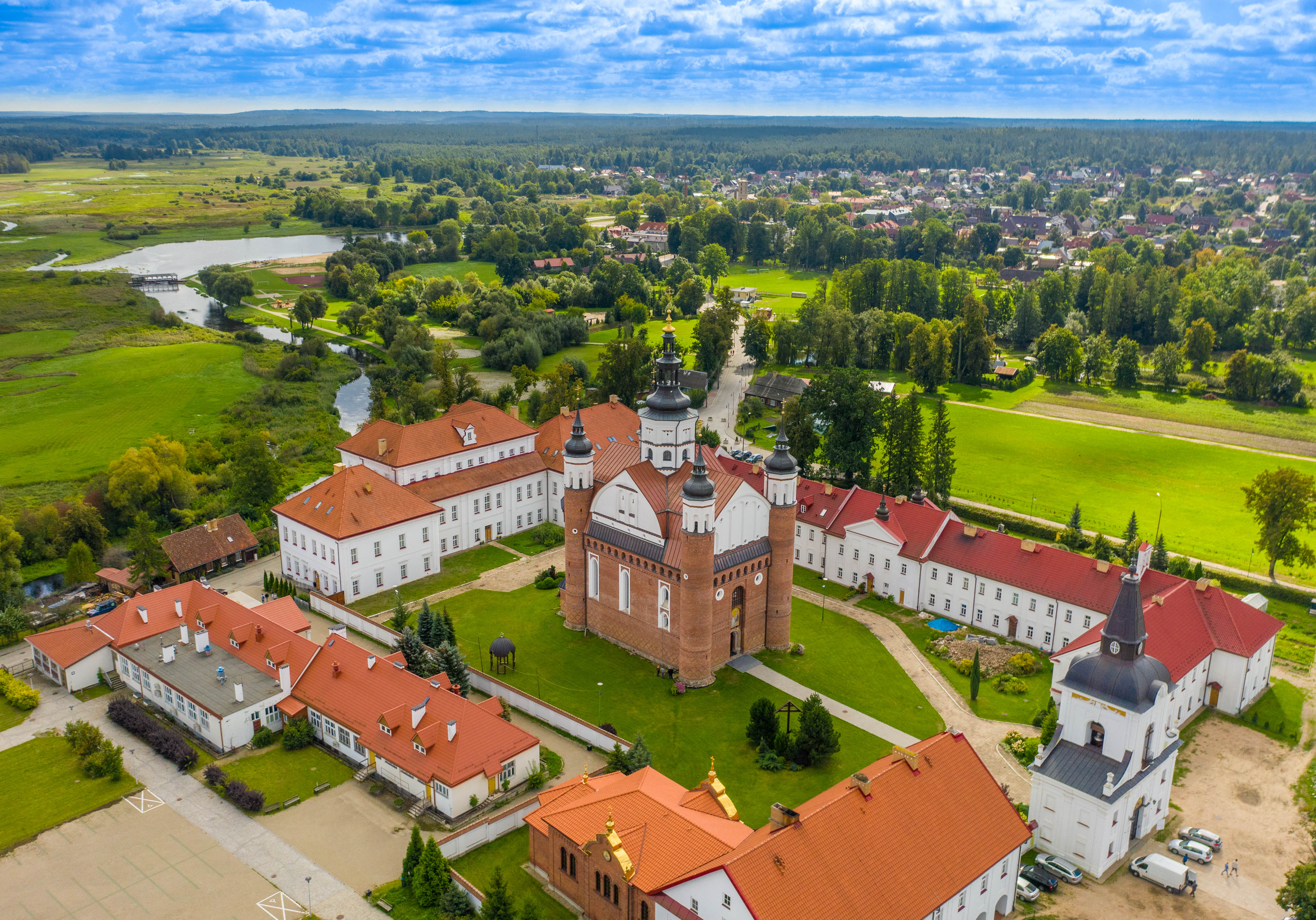
- Monastery of the Annunciation in Supraśl

- Flag Coat of arms

- Location within Poland
- Coordinates: 53°13′N 23°20′E
- Country: Poland
- Voivodeship: Podlaskie
- County: Białystok
- Gmina: Supraśl

Government
  - Mayor: Radosław Dobrowolski

Area
  - Total: 5.68 km^{2} (2.19 sq mi)

Population (2017)
  - Total: 4,621
  - Density: 814/km^{2} (2,110/sq mi)
- Time zone: UTC+1 (CET)
  - Summer (DST): UTC+2 (CEST)
- Postal code: 16-030
- Area code: +48 85
- Vehicle registration: BIA
- Website: http://www.suprasl.pl

Supraśl (Note: Polish: [ˈsupraɕl]; Belarusian: Су́прасль; Lithuanian: Supraslė) is a spa town and former episcopal see in Białystok County, in Podlaskie Voivodeship, in north-eastern Poland. It is the seat of the Gmina Supraśl.

It is situated on the Supraśl River, about 15 kilometres (9.3 miles) northeast of Białystok. Its population is 4,526 (2004).

== History ==
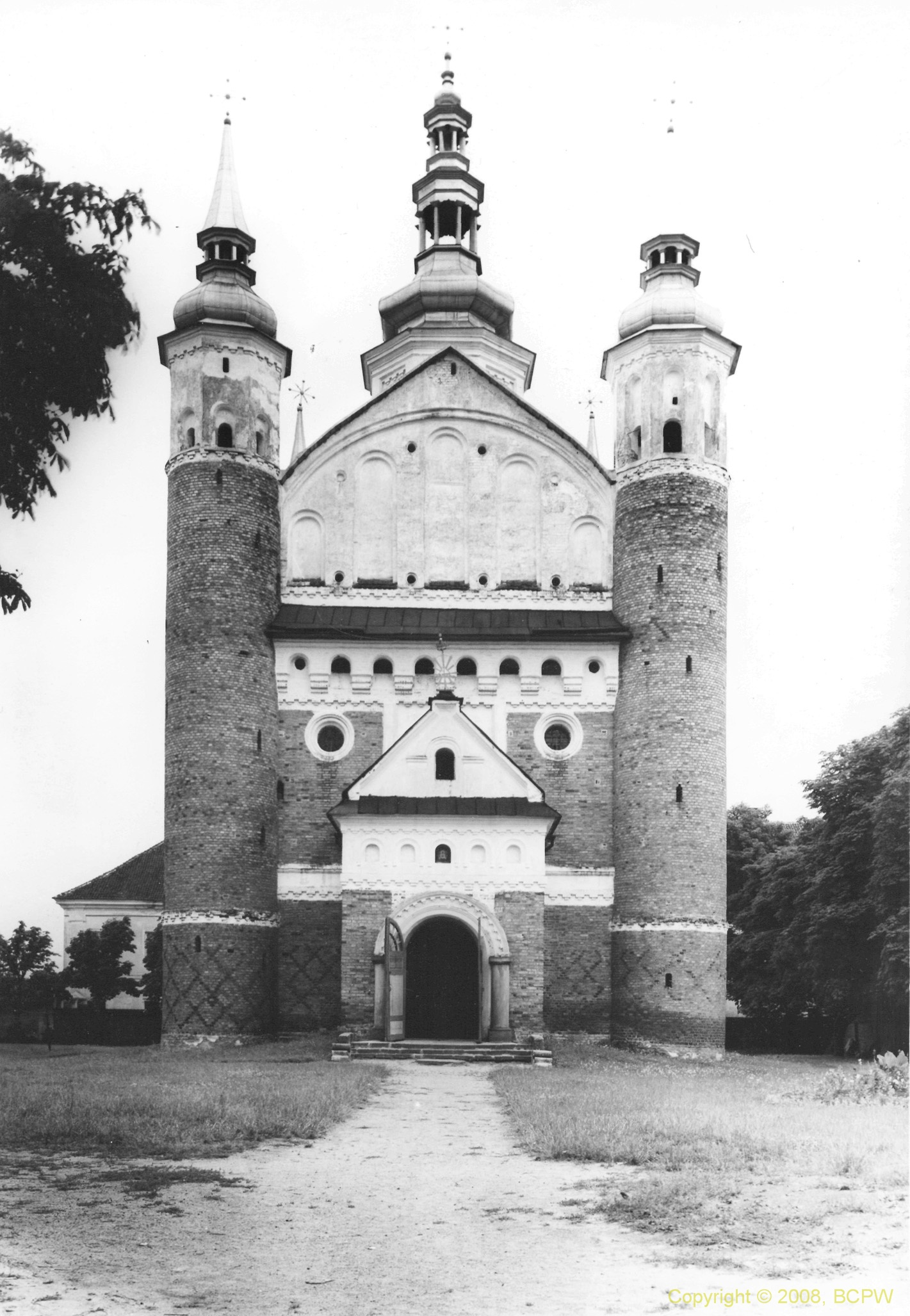
Supraśl Orthodox Monastery in the 1930s

The settlement was founded in the 16th century. There was a rich library at the monastery, which included Polish, Latin, French and Ruthenian works. A printing house and paper mill were established in 1695 and 1711, respectively. In 1730, King Augustus II the Strong stopped in Supraśl during his return trip from the Sejm of the Polish–Lithuanian Commonwealth in Grodno to Warsaw. After the Third Partition of Poland in 1795, it was annexed by Prussia. Under Prussian rule, the printing house was closed down. In 1807 it passed to the Russian Partition of Poland. In 1823, a 10th-century manuscript, the oldest Slavic literary work in Poland, named the Codex Suprasliensis, was discovered in the Supraśl Monastery by Michał Bobrowski.

After 1831, the textile industry developed. In 1834 manufacturer Wilhelm Fryderyk Zachert came from Zgierz to Supraśl and significantly contributed to the development of the village into a town. Until the mid-19th century, it was the largest center of the textile industry in the region, before it was surpassed by nearby Białystok. In 1853, the school attached to the monastery was moved to Grodno. In 1865, a new folk school was established. In the 19th century, mostly Catholics lived there, but also Protestants, Orthodox and Jews. During World War I from 1915 to 1919 it was occupied by the Germans. After 1919, in independent Poland.

During World War II it was occupied by the Soviets from 1939 to 1941 and by the Germans from 1941 to 1944. The Soviets destroyed part of the monastery's interior, and the Germans destroyed most of the industrial plants. The local primary school principal and two Polish policemen were murdered by the Russians in the Katyn massacre in 1940.

From 1944 to 1998, it was administratively located in the Białystok Voivodeship.

In 2001 Supraśl was recognized as a spa town.

=== Ecclesiastical History ===
- On 6 March 1798 was established the Ruthenian Catholic Eparchy (Eastern Catholic Diocese) of Supraśl / Supraslien(sis) Ruthenorum (Latin adjective), on presently Polish territory not previously served by that particular church sui iuris (Byzantine Rite in Ruthenian language). Pope Pius VI's papal bulla Susceptam a Nobis di papa, thus canonically executed its erection, which was devised by the Prussian kingdom (Fredrick William II) in January 1797 for the parts of the Eparchy of Brėst and Archeparchy of Kiev that became Prussian in the Third partition of Poland. The Pope made it exempt, i.e. directly subject to the Holy See, not part of any ecclesiastical province, and installed a cathedral chapter comprising a provost and four canons.
- It was suppressed on 1809.02.14, without Catholic successor, by imperial edict of the Czar Alexander I of Russia, annexing it to the Eparchy of Brest, after the Convention of Bartenstein (April 1807) and Peace of Tilsit (July 1807) transferred its territory from Prussia to the Russian empire.

It has had only three incumbents:

Exempt Eparch (Bishops) of Supraśl of the Ruthenians

- Theodosius Wislocki, Basilian Order of Saint Josaphat (O.S.B.M.) (1797 – death 1801.05.18)
- Nicholas Duchnowski (1803.05.16 – death 1805.06.25)
- Bishop-elect Father Leo Jaworowski (1807 – 1809 not possessed lacking confirmation by Rome), next Auxiliary bishop of Eparch Jozafat Bułhak in Brest and titular bishop of Volodymyr.

Supraśl is also a titular bishopric of the Polish Orthodox Church.

== Demographics ==
Historical population

Year	Pop.	±%
1857	3,450	—
1871	2,800	−18.8%
1880	3,091	+10.4%
1897	2,159	−30.2%
1910	2,400	+11.2%
1921	2,322	−3.2%

Year	Pop.	±%
1931	2,965	+27.7%
1939	3,017	+1.8%
1950	2,317	−23.2%
1960	3,471	+49.8%
2010	4,606	+32.7%

== Culture and heritage ==
It is the home of the Supraśl Lavra, founded by Aleksander Chodkiewicz, one of six Eastern Orthodox monasteries for men in Poland. The Codex Suprasliensis, the oldest Slavic literary work in Poland and one of the oldest of its kind in the world, is named after the Supraśl Lavra. Since September 2007, the work has been on UNESCO's Memory of the World list. The Museum of Icons is located in the Chodkiewicz Palace within the monastery complex.

Other historic landmarks include the Buchholtz Palace, which now houses the Art High School, the Catholic churches of Our Lady Queen of Poland and of the Holy Trinity, the town hall, cinema, a 19th-century park and historic wooden architecture.

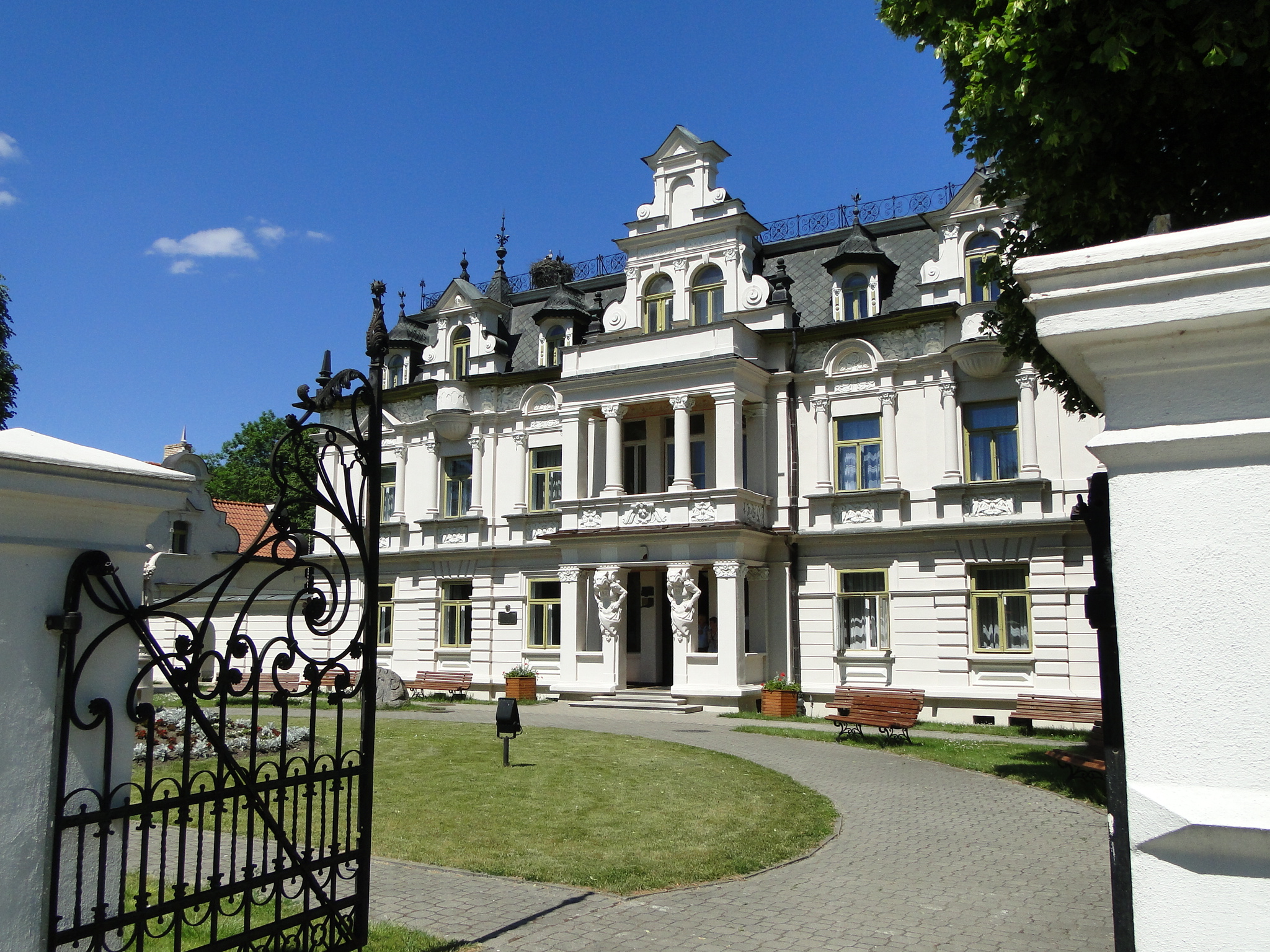
Buchholtz Palace

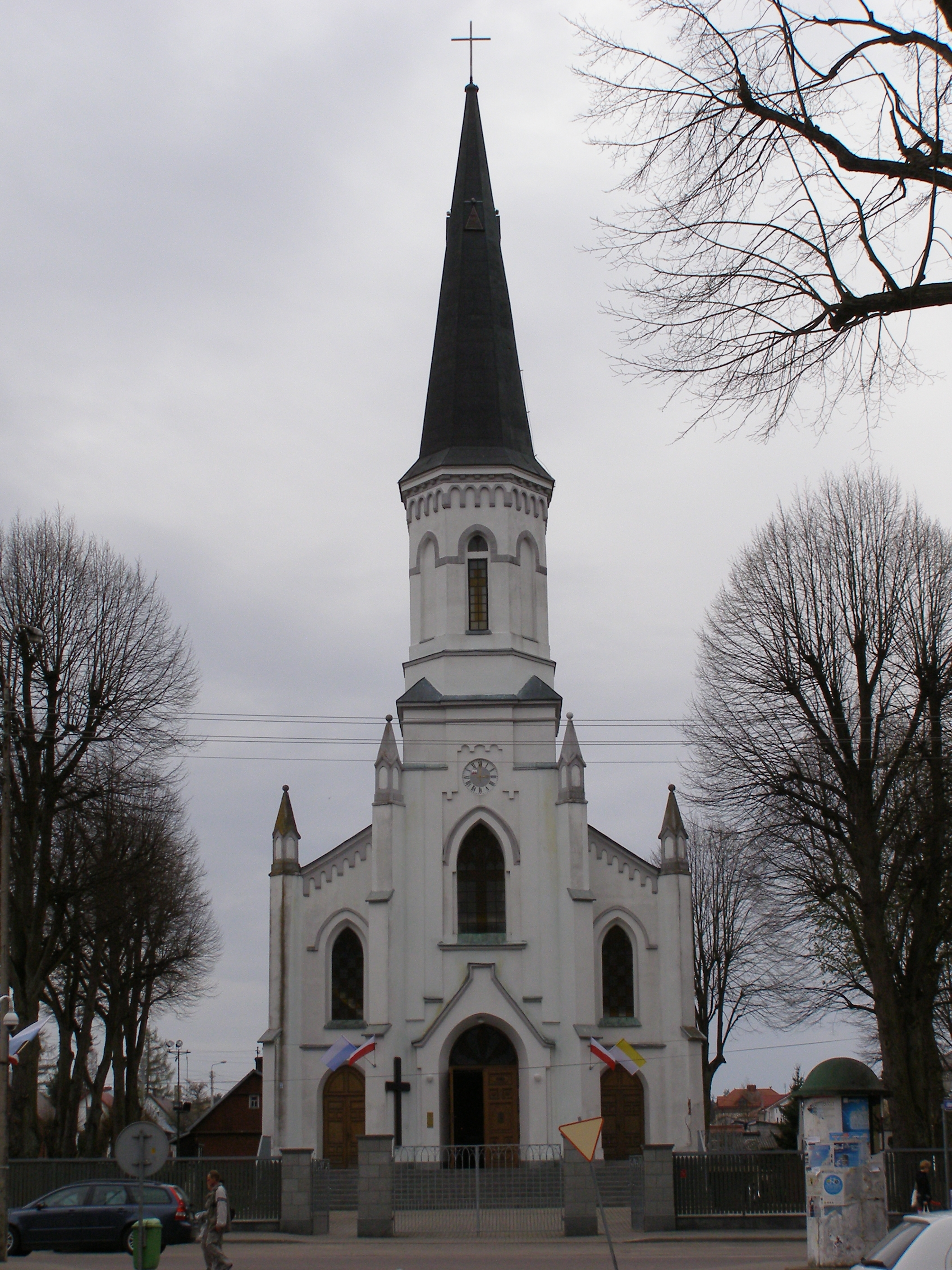
Our Lady Queen of Poland church

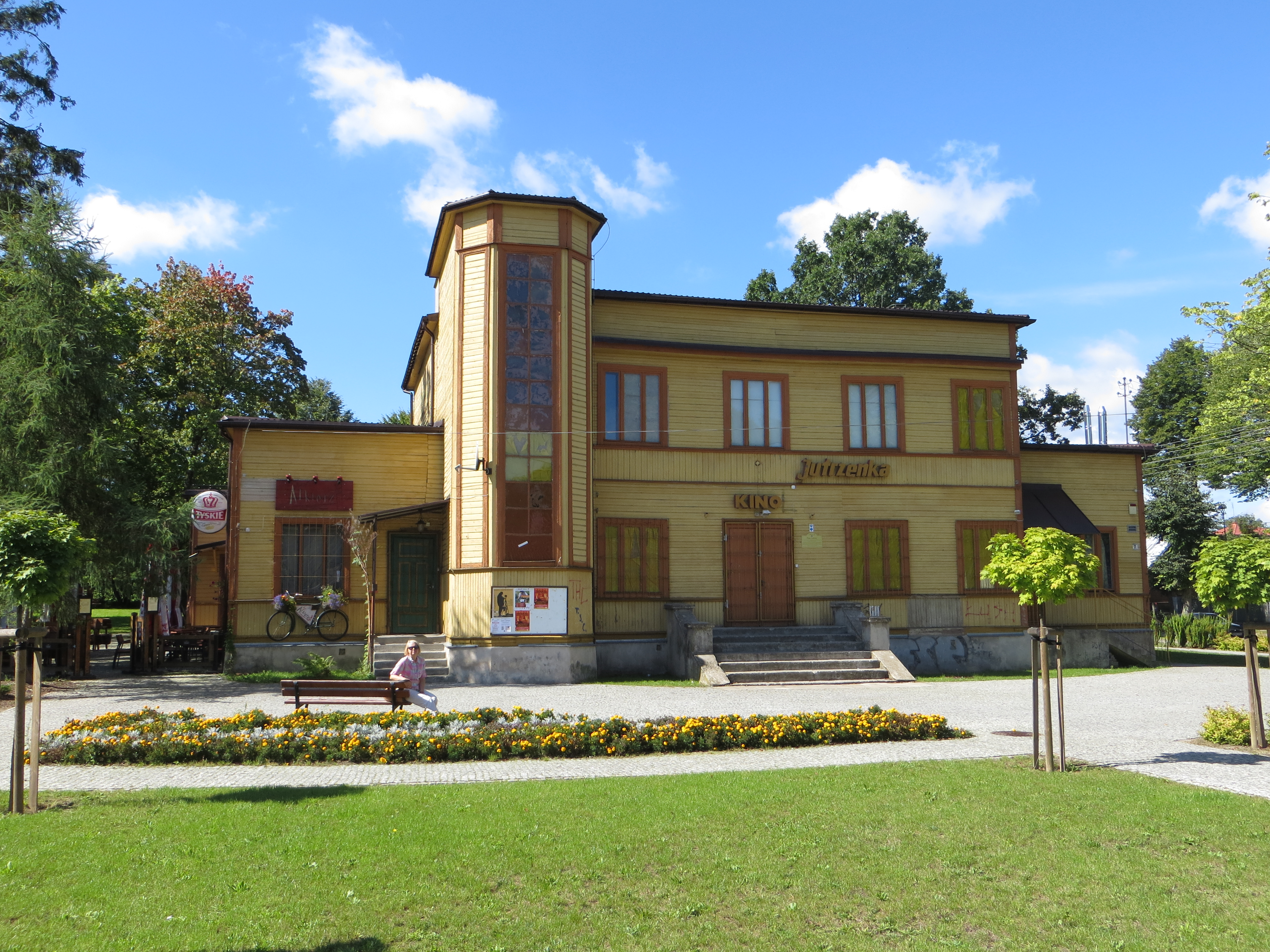
Cinema

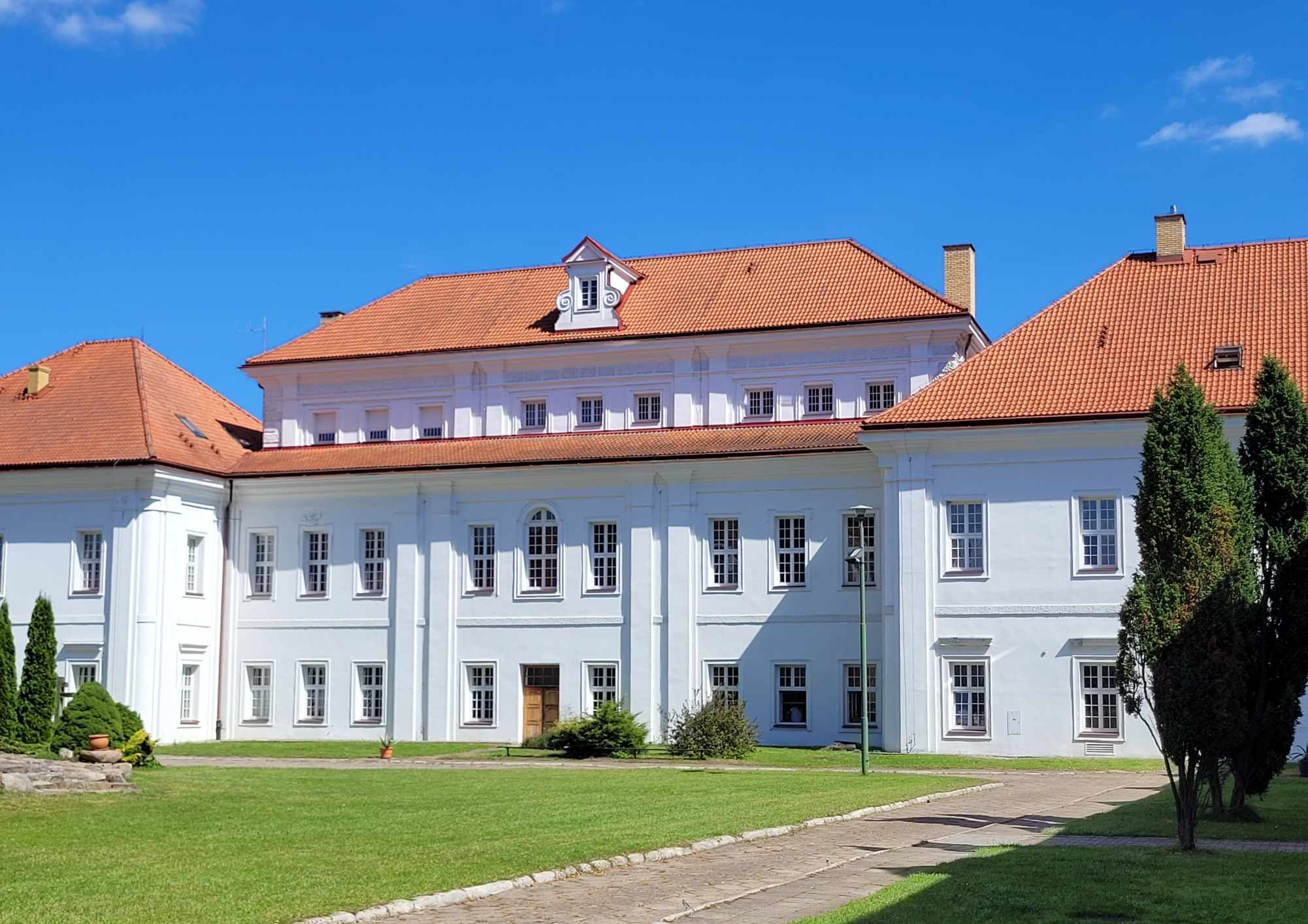
Chodkiewicz Palace

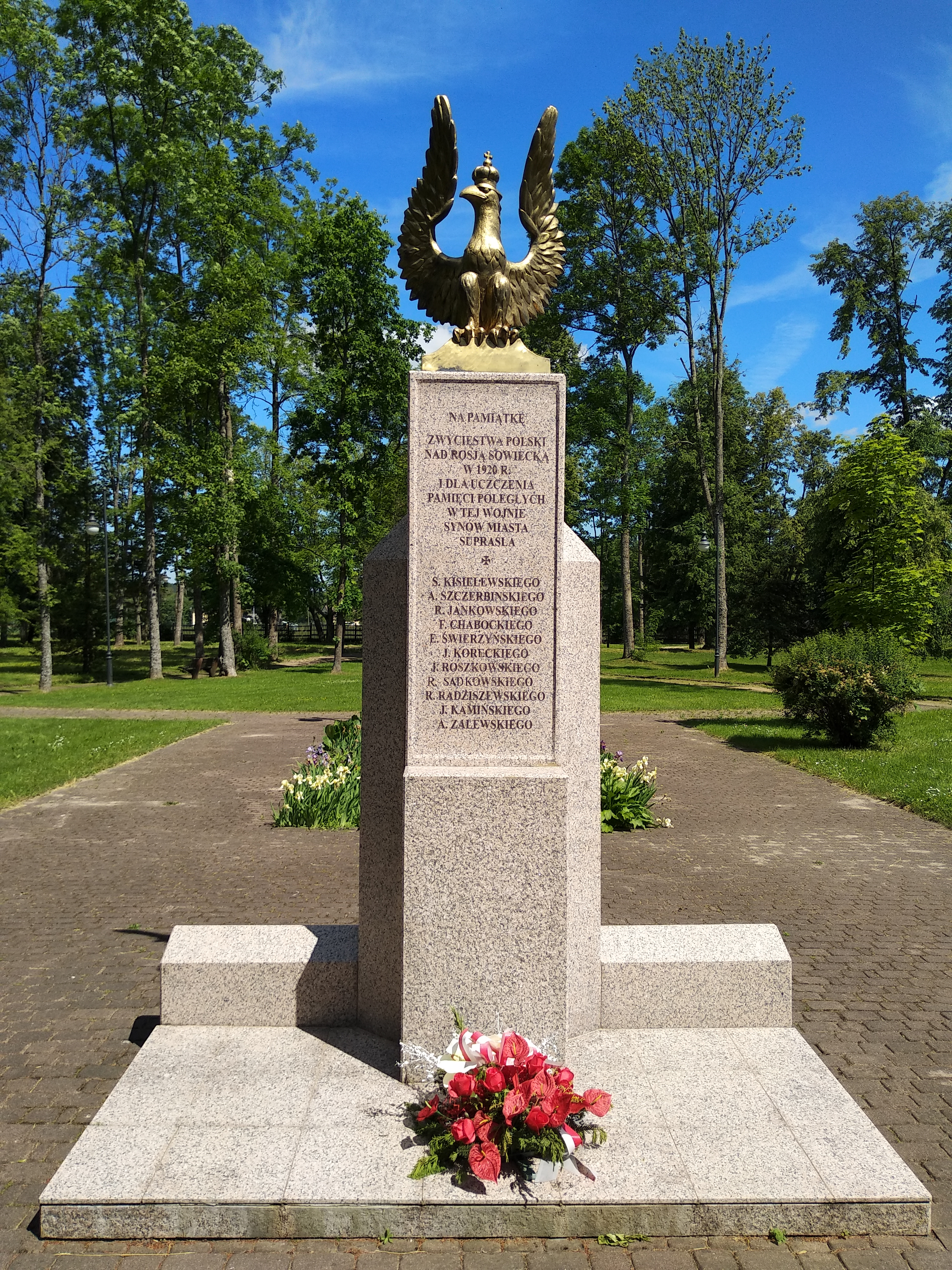
Monument to the Polish victory in the Polish–Soviet War in 1920 in the municipal park

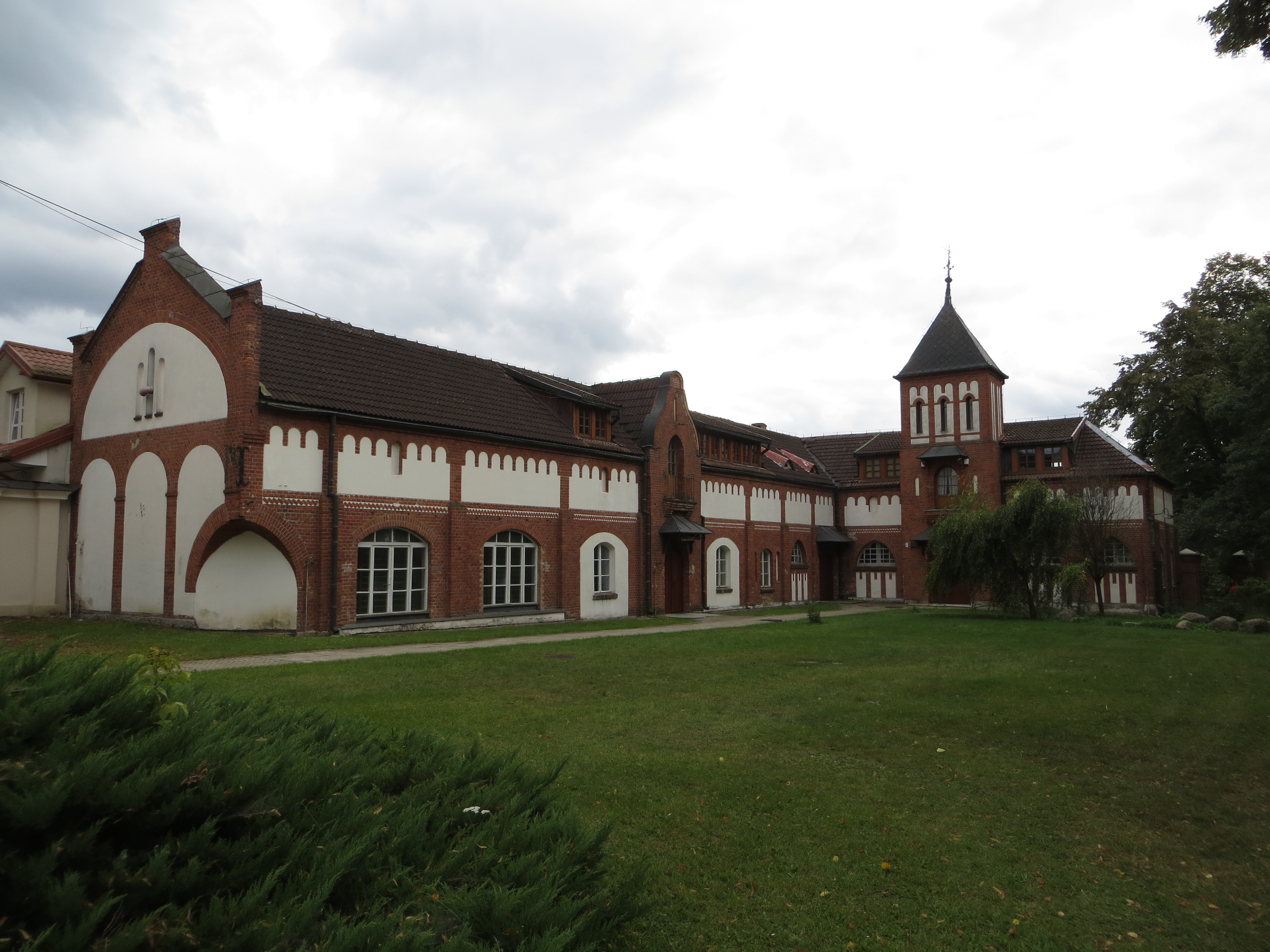
Coach house of the Buchholtz Palace

== Twin towns and sister cities ==
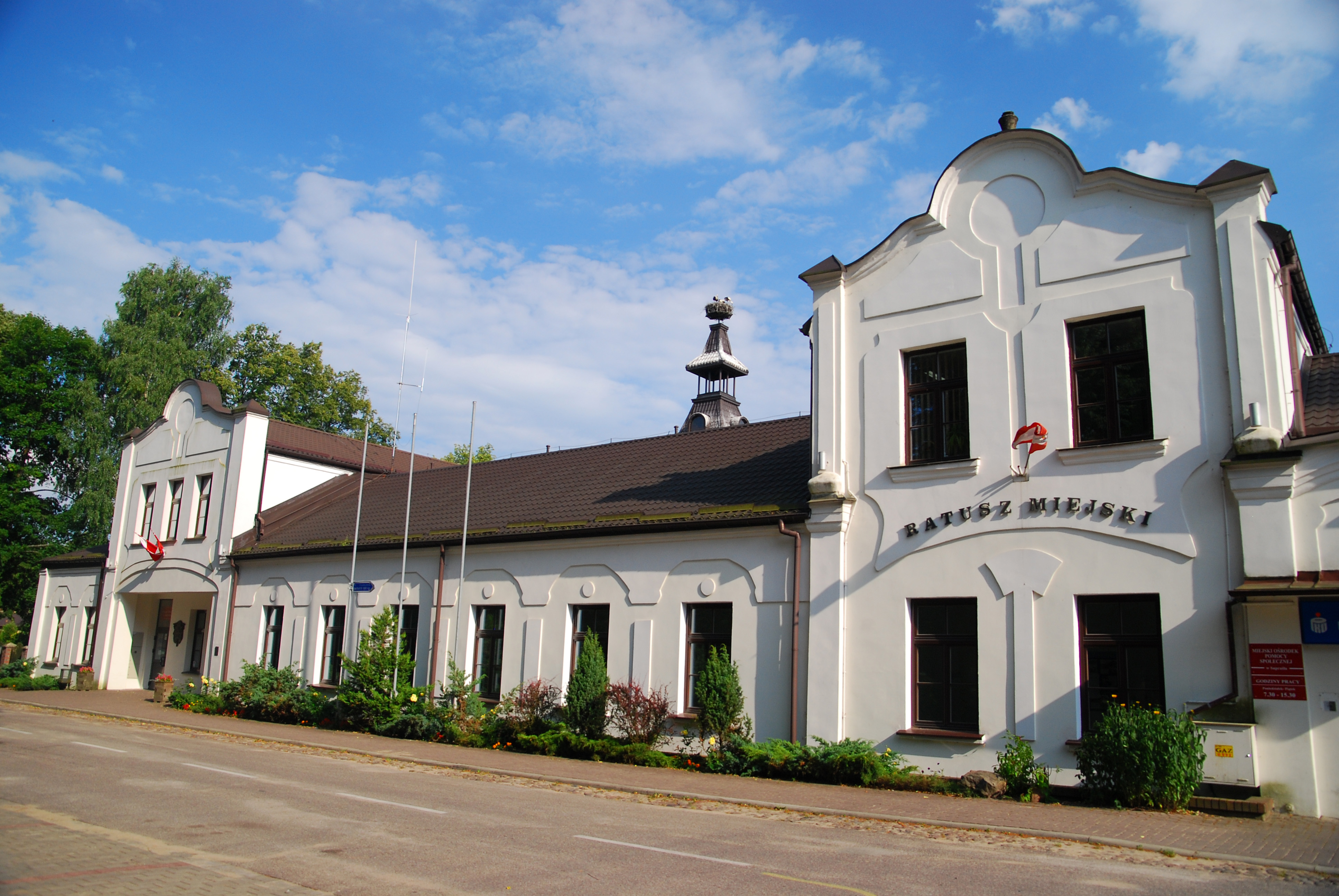
Town hall

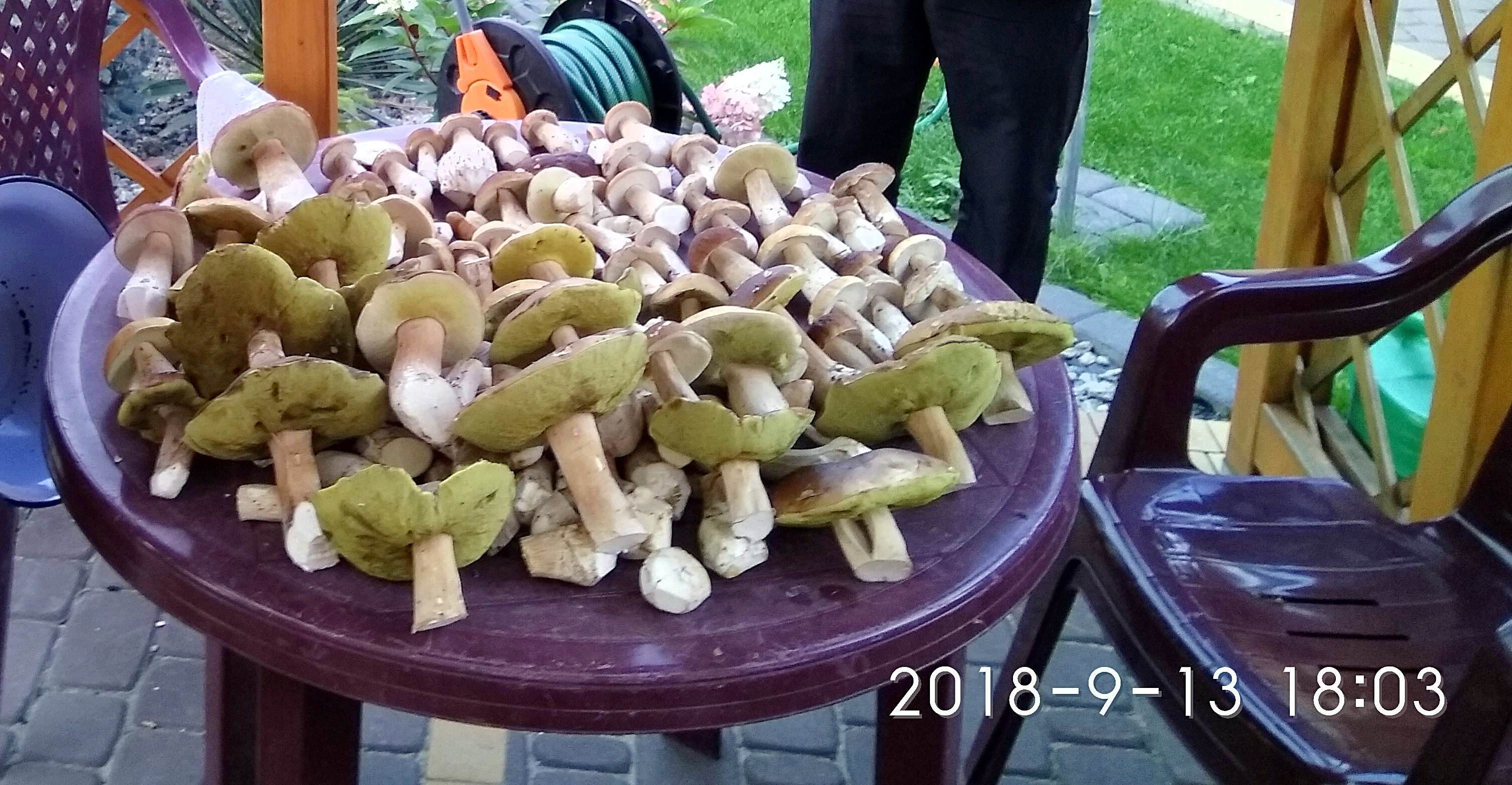
The boletus mushroom (known in polish as borowiki) harvest in Supraśl, the photograph of September 2018

Supraśl is partnered with:

- Balsthal (Switzerland) – 1998
- Großenkneten (Germany) – 1999
- Porthcawl (Wales) – 2001
- Zgierz (Poland, Łódź Voivodeship) – 2001
- Druskienniki (Lithuania) – 2004
- Augustów (Poland, Podlaskie Voivodeship) – 2012
- Nemenčinė (Lithuania) – 2017
- Kamianka-Buzka (Ukraine) – 2023

== Nature ==
Supraśl is surrounded by the Knyszyn Forest Landscape Park.

== Transport ==
Supraśl is connected to the regional road network, primarily via Voivodeship road 676, which links the town to Białystok. Public transport is primarily provided by bus line 500 (including variant 500A), operated by PKS Nova, offering regular hourly connections to Białystok. Although Supraśl does not have a railway station, the nearest major rail hub is located in Białystok, approximately 16 km to the southwest. The town is also accessible by bicycle routes and is known for its pedestrian-friendly layout.

== See also ==
- List of Catholic dioceses in Poland

== Sources and external links ==
- Official town webpage
- GCatholic

Bibliography - ecclesiastical history

- Augustin Theiner, Die neuesten Zustände der Katholischen Kirche beider Ritus in Polen und Rußland seit Katharina II. bis auf unsere Tage, Augsburg 1841
- Konrad Eubel, Hierarchia Catholica Medii Aevi, vol. 6, p. 389
- Alfred Ignatowicz, Greckokatolicka diecezja supraska (1796–1807), in "Wiadomości Kościele Archidiecezji w białymstoku" 1976, r. 2, nr 4, pp. 105–116.
- Radosław Dobrowolski, Opat Supraski Biskup Leon Ludwik Jaworowski, Supraśl 2003, p. 333.
- Nikolaj Dalmatov, Supraslskij Blagowescanskij Monastyr, St. Peterburg 1892, p. 611.
- Gaetano Moroni, Dizionario di erudizione storico-ecclesiastica, vol. 71, Venice 1855, pp. 76–78
- Leonard Drożdżewicz, Overheard in Suprasl Academy, „Znad Wilii”, Viešoji įstaiga „Znad Wilii” kultūros plėtros draugija, ISSN 1392-9712 indeks 327956, nr 1 (81) z 2020 r., pp. 91–97, (in Polish)http://www.znadwiliiwilno.lt/wp-content/uploads/2020/04/Znad-Wilii-1-81m-1-1.pdf
- Pichura, H (1970). "The Podobny Texts and Chants of the Supraśl Irmologion of 1601". The Journal of Byelorussian Studies. II (2): 192–221.
