= Anthony of Supraśl =

Ruthenian monk

St. Anthony of Supraśl

Venerable Martyr
- Born: second half of the 15th century Grand Duchy of Lithuania
- Died: February 4, 1516 [O.S.] Thessalonica
- Venerated in: Eastern Orthodox Church
- Canonized: 2005, Poland by Polish Orthodox Church
- Feast: February 4

Anthony of Supraśl (Polish: Antoni Supraski) was a Ruthenian monk and martyr, now venerated in the Polish Orthodox Church.

== Biography ==
Anthony was born on the Grand Duchy of Lithuania territory into an Orthodox family, although his social status and lay name remain unknown. According to tradition, he was known for his angry character in his youth, having eventually killed a man in a bar brawl. Wishing to atone for sin, he entered the Supraśl Orthodox Monastery sometime before 1506, where he received the name Anthony.

Considering his penance insufficient, Anthony asked the abbot for permission to go to a Muslim country, where he might receive martyrdom, which was then refused. Anthony only received permission to go to Mount Athos, where he vowed Great Schema and took the monastic name Onuphrius. He then went to Thessalonica, into the Church of the Theotokos Acheiropoietos, which had been converted into a mosque, and began to pray demonstratively as a Christian. He was arrested for blasphemy and thrown into prison. As was the custom in the Ottoman Empire at the time, the kadi offered to pardon him in return for his conversion to Islam, which he consistently refused while attacking the religion. Finally, he was sentenced to burning at the stake. Going to the place of execution, Anthony continued to denounce Islam, and even spat on the face of one of the guards. At this point, he was fatally hit by a club. His body was burned.
