= Walery Rzewuski =

Polish photographer and activist

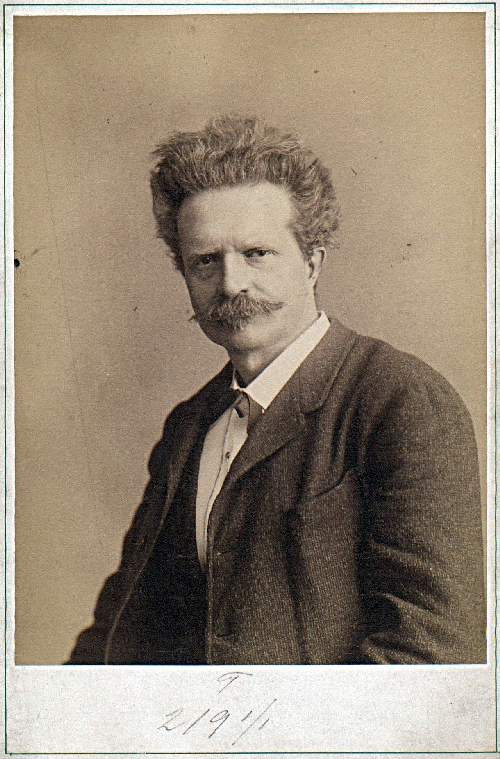
Walery Rzewuski photographed in his own studio 1880s

Walery Rzewuski (14 April 1837, in Kraków – 18 November 1888, in Kraków) was a Polish photographer, social activist and an alderman in Kraków.

Rzewuski is considered to be one of Poland's most important 19th-century photographers. He was the author of many portraits of cultural figures, scientists, nobles, entrepreneurs and members of government.

The State Museum of the History of Photography in Kraków is named after Rzewuski .
