= Leo Jaworowski =

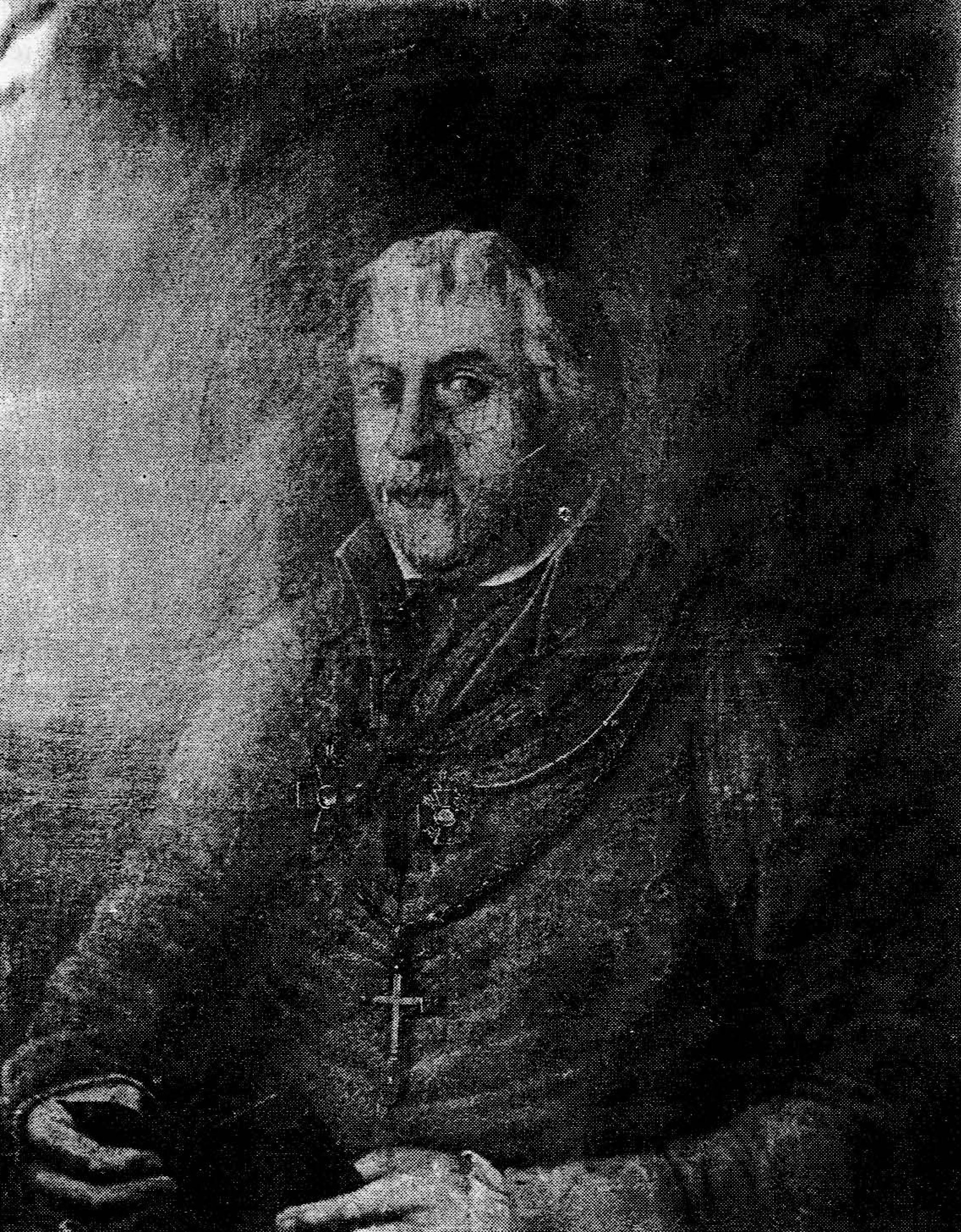

Leo Jaworowski (born as Ludwik Jaworowski; Polish: Leon Ludwik Jaworowski; 1764 – 2 November 1833) was a bishop of the Ruthenian Uniate Church served administrator for Suprasl Eparchy.

In 1806-07 as a priest Leo Jaworowski served as administrator of Suprasl Eparchy.

On 27 January 1811 he was consecrated as a titular bishop of Wlodzimierz and Bresc by bishops Gregory Kochanowicz, John Krasowski, Josaphat Bulhak and Adrian Holownia.

In 1825 Jaworowski assisted in consecration of bishop Cyril Syrotinski.

== See also ==
- Supraśl Orthodox Monastery

Catholic Church titles
Preceded by Nicholas Duchnowski	Administrator of Suprasl Eparchy; 1806 – 1807	Eparchy suppressed
