= State Higher Vocational School in Tarnow =

Coordinates: 50.0156°N 20.9904°E

Academy of Science in Tarnow
- Akademia Nauk Stosowanych w Tarnowie
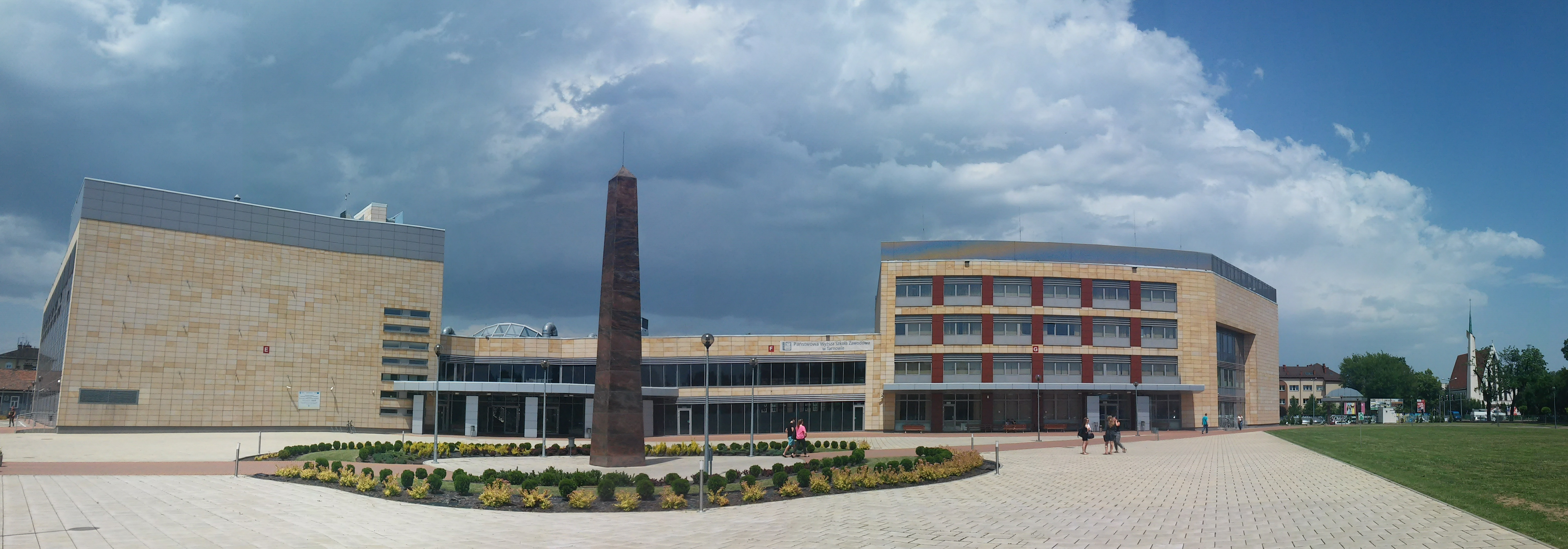
- Latin: Collegium Tarnoviense
- Motto: Per aspera ad astra
- Established: 19 May 1998
- Academic affiliations: UICEE, ESNA, ECTNA, EURASHE
- Rector: Jadwiga Laska
- Students: 3,461 (12.2023)
- Location: ul. Adama Mickiewicza 8, Tarnów, 33-100, Pol
- Website: www.pwsztar.edu.pl

State Higher Vocational School in Tarnów (Państwowa Wyższa Szkoła Zawodowa w Tarnowie) – a public, vocational type university, created on the basis of the Council of Ministers of 19 May 1998 as the first university in Poland of a new type of vocational educating undergraduate and engineering.

The university operates under the Act of 26 June 1997 on higher vocational schools (Ustawa z dnia 26 czerwca 1997 roku o wyższych szkołach zawodowych), the statute and other regulations issued on its basis.

== Institutes and specializations ==
In 2012, the university offered studies, both full-time) and part-time, for licentiate (3 years) or engineering (3.5 years) for the sixteen specializations:

Institute of Humanistic

- Polish studies
- English studies
- German studies
- Romance studies

Institute of Mathematics and Natural Sciences

- Chemistry,
- Mathematics,
- Environmental protection,

Polytechnic Institute

- Electronics and telecommunication,
- Electrical engineering,
- Computer science,
- Materials science,

Institute of Administration and Economics

- Administration,
- Economics,

Institute of Health Protection

- Physical therapy,
- Nursing,
- Physical education,

Art Institute

- Graphics,
- Design.

== National cooperation ==
- AGH University of Science and Technology in Kraków
- Jagiellonian University in Kraków
- Bronisław Czech University School of Physical Education in Krakow
- Agricultural University of Kraków
- Jan Matejko Academy of Fine Arts in Kraków

== International cooperation ==
- Università degli Studi di Trieste, Italy
- Pädagogische Akademie des Bundes, Vienna, Austria
- Université Sorbonne Nouvelle, Paris, France
- Université de Nantes, Nantes, France
- Haute École Blaise Pascal du Luxembourg (Belgium), in Bastogne, Belgium
- Haute École namuroise catholique, in Malonne, Belgium
- Universitatea Babeş-Bolya, Cluj-Napoca, Romania
- Hochschule Wismar, Germany
- Keski-Pohjanmaan Ammattikorkeakoulu – Mellersta Österbottens Yrkeshögskola Politechnika w Kokkola, Finland
- University of Naples Federico II, Italy
- Gaziantep Üniversitesi, Turkey
- Blackburn College, an Association of Lancaster University, England
- Università degli Studi di Urbino Carlo Bo (Italy).

== Rectors of Higher Vocational School in Tarnow ==
- Adam Juszkiewicz (1998-2007)
- Stanisław Komornicki (2007-2015)
- Jadwiga Laska (2015-2019)
