= Museum of Photography in Kraków =

Museum in Poland

Coordinates: 50.07043041065809°N 19.95419140833955°E

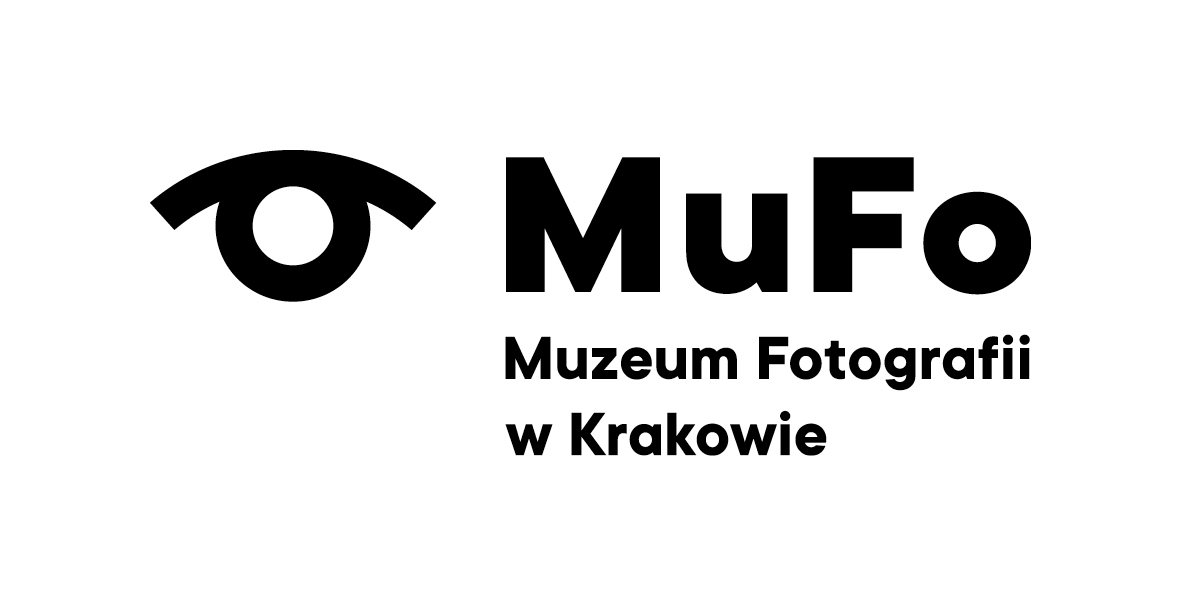
- Established: 31 December 1986
- Location: Rakowicka 22 A Kraków, Poland
- Website: www.mufo.krakow.pl

The Walery Rzewuski Museum of Photography in Kraków (Polish: Muzeum Fotografii w Krakowie) is a state-run photography museum in Kraków, Poland, established as the only one of its kind a mere three years before the collapse of the Soviet empire. The venue survived the transition successfully owing to new programmes. The museum building is located on Józefitów 16 street in the Krowodrza district (north-west of Kleparz).

In 2018, the second museum section opened in a historic building of the shooting range on Królowej Jadwigi Street. It is called MuFo Strzelnica.

In 2021, the third museum section opened in an old building of the Austrian barracks on Rakowicka Street. It is called MuFo Rakowicka.

The Museum's mission is the collection and popularizing of historical photographs, as well as research and more recently the digitization of images for the online museum. Aside from exhibits and international symposiums, the museum has a collection of early photographic equipment and its own vast library of albums, archives, catalogs, books and manuals, as well as a press room.
