= Supraśl Orthodox Monastery =

Monastery in Podlaskie, Poland

Monastery of the Annunciation in Supraśl
- Monaster Zwiastowania Najświętszej Marii Panny w Supraślu (Polish)
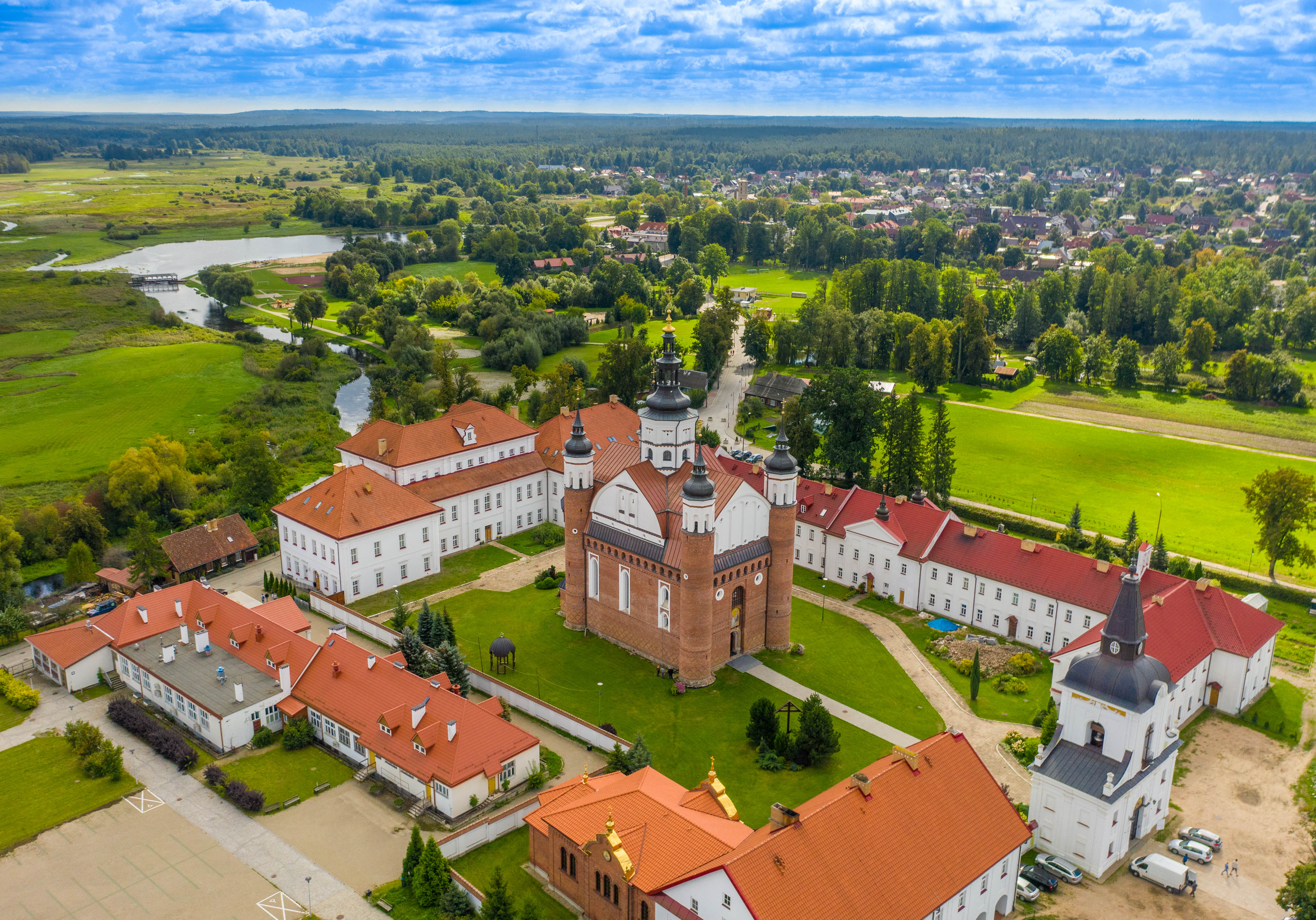
- View of the monastery, September 2020
- Interactive map of Monastery of the Annunciation in Supraśl

Monastery information
- Order: Polish Orthodox Church
- Established: 1498

People
- Founders: Aleksander Chodkiewicz & Joseph Soltan

Site
- Location: Supraśl, Poland
- Coordinates: 53°12′39.48″N 23°20′13.53″E
- Website: www.monaster-suprasl.pl

The Monastery of the Annunciation in Supraśl (Polish: Monaster Zwiastowania Najświętszej Marii Panny w Supraślu; Belarusian: Супрасльскі Дабравешчанскі манастыр; Russian: Супрасльский Благовещенский монастырь), also known as the Supraśl Lavra, is a monastery in Supraśl in north-eastern Poland in the Podlaskie Voivodeship. Today it belongs to the autocephalous Polish Orthodox Church and is one of six Eastern Orthodox Christian men's monasteries in Poland. In 2023, the monastery was designated an official Polish Historic Monument.

== History ==
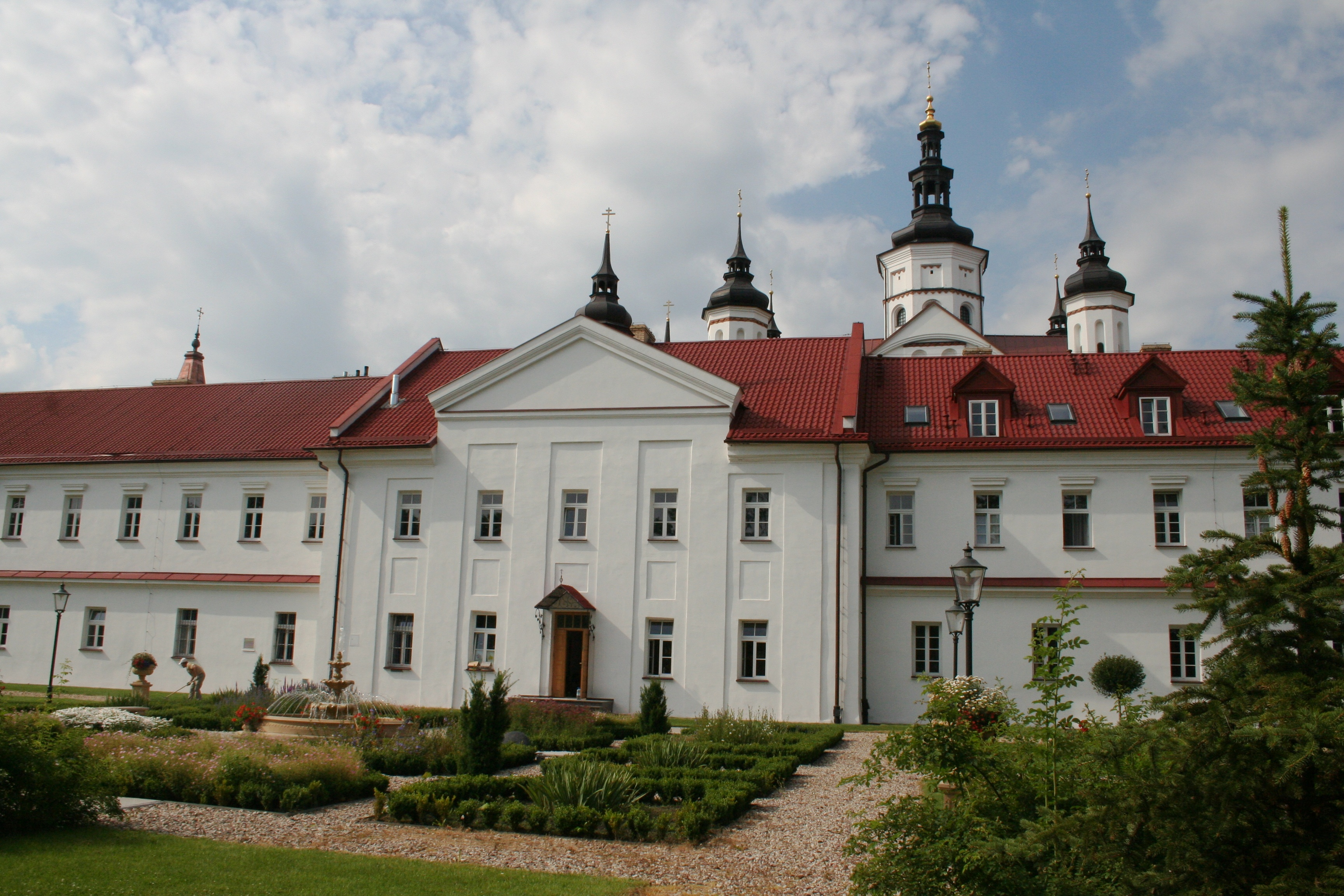
Another view of the Monastery complex

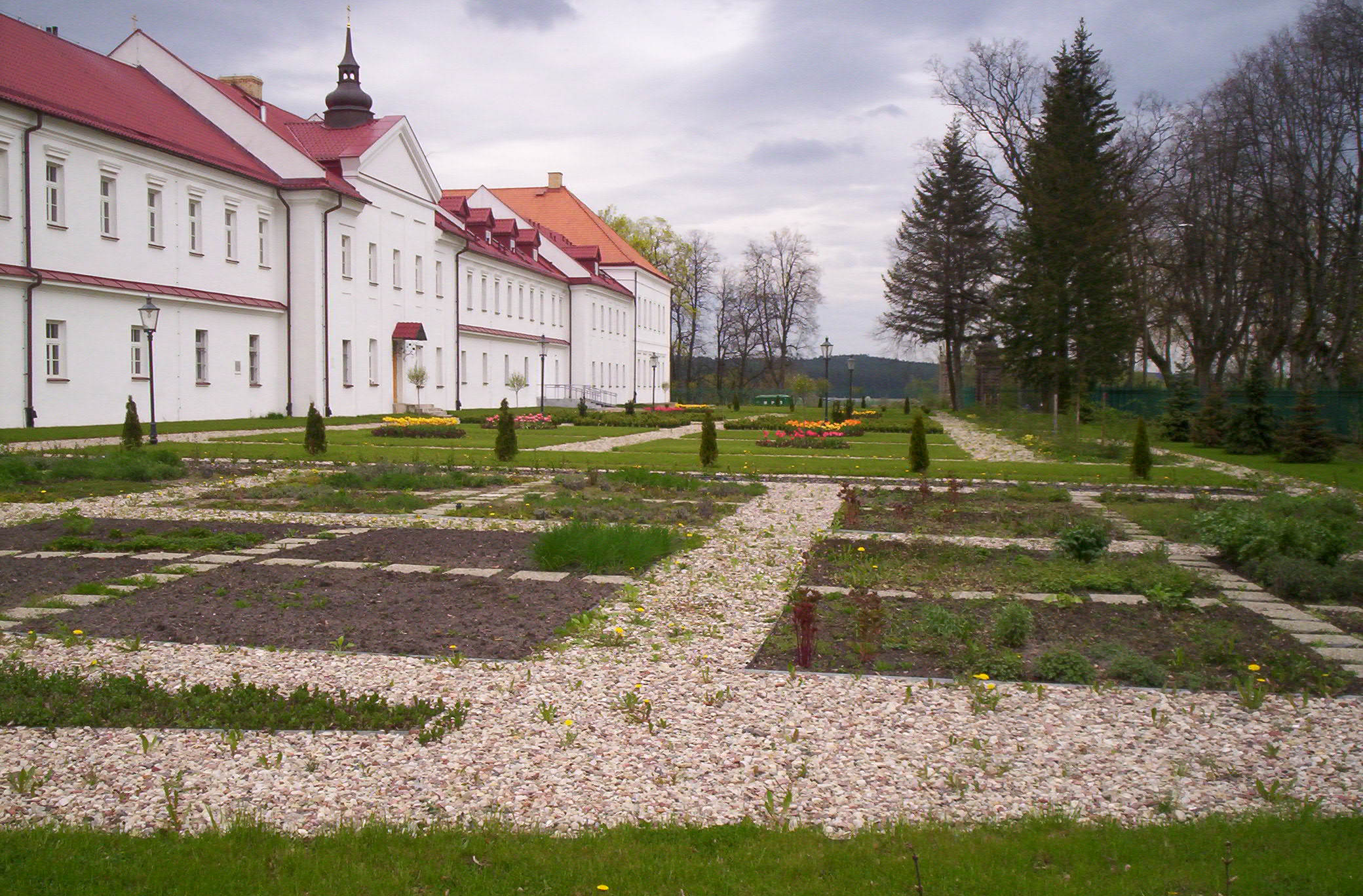
The monastery's renaissance gardens

The Supraśl Orthodox Monastery was founded in 1498 by the voivode of Nowogródek and the Marshall of the Great Duchy of Lithuania Aleksander Chodkiewicz and the Archbishop (Archepiscope) of Smolensk and Archimandrite of Slutsk Joseph Soltan. Jeremias II Tranos, the Patriarch of Constantinople issued a special Tomos sanctioning its foundation. 1501 saw the building of the first wooden church of St. John the Evangelist. In this period, Anthony of Supraśl lived in the monastery before his martyrdom. In 1516, the Church of the Annunciation was consecrated, later the monastery was further expanded with the addition of another church dedicated to the Resurrection of Our Lord, which housed the monastery catacombs. With the passing of the years, the Supraśl Lavra became an important site of Orthodox culture as a result of its large library and lively contacts with other important Orthodox sites such as the Kiev Lavra and Mount Athos.

In 1609, the Monastery was one of the first entities to accept the Union of Brest in the Polish-Lithuanian Commonwealth, and the Basilian Order took over its administration. The Basilians oversaw the rebuilding of the Monastery complex and expansion of its publishing activity. At the end of the 17th century, a printing house was established and, over a period of slightly more than one hundred years, published 350 titles in Ruthenian, Polish, and Latin. During that same period, several filial monasteries were also established, the most noteworthy being the filial monastery in Warsaw, which has remained in operation to this day. In 1796, Prussian authorities confiscated the holdings of the monastery after the Third Partition of Poland. Nevertheless, it continued to play an important role in the religious life of the region as the seat of a newly created eparchy for those devout Ruthenians under Prussian rule, starting in 1797 and lasting until it fell under Russian rule after the Treaties of Tilsit in 1807.

In 1824, the Russians gave the monastery complex to the Russian Orthodox Church. In 1875, the St. Panteleimon church was built, in 1889, St. John the Theologian, and finally in 1901, St. George the Victor. In 1910, there was a restoration of the 16th century frescoes, which had been covered up by the Basilians. In the aftermath of the havoc of World War I, the monks fled from the monastery for the interior of Russia, taking with them the miraculous icon of Our Lady of Supraśl.

In the period between the two world wars, the monastery was used by the Latin Rite Salesian Order. In 1944, the retreating German army destroyed the Church of the Annunciation, along with all of its precious frescoes. The Communist government turned the monastery into an agricultural academy. After the collapse of the Communist government, the monastery was turned over to the Polish Autocephalous Orthodox Church, which immediately began the still ongoing conservation work and renovation of the monastery.

The Codex of Supraśl, the oldest Slavic literary work in Poland and one of the oldest of its kind in the world, is named after this monastery.

== Monastery complex ==
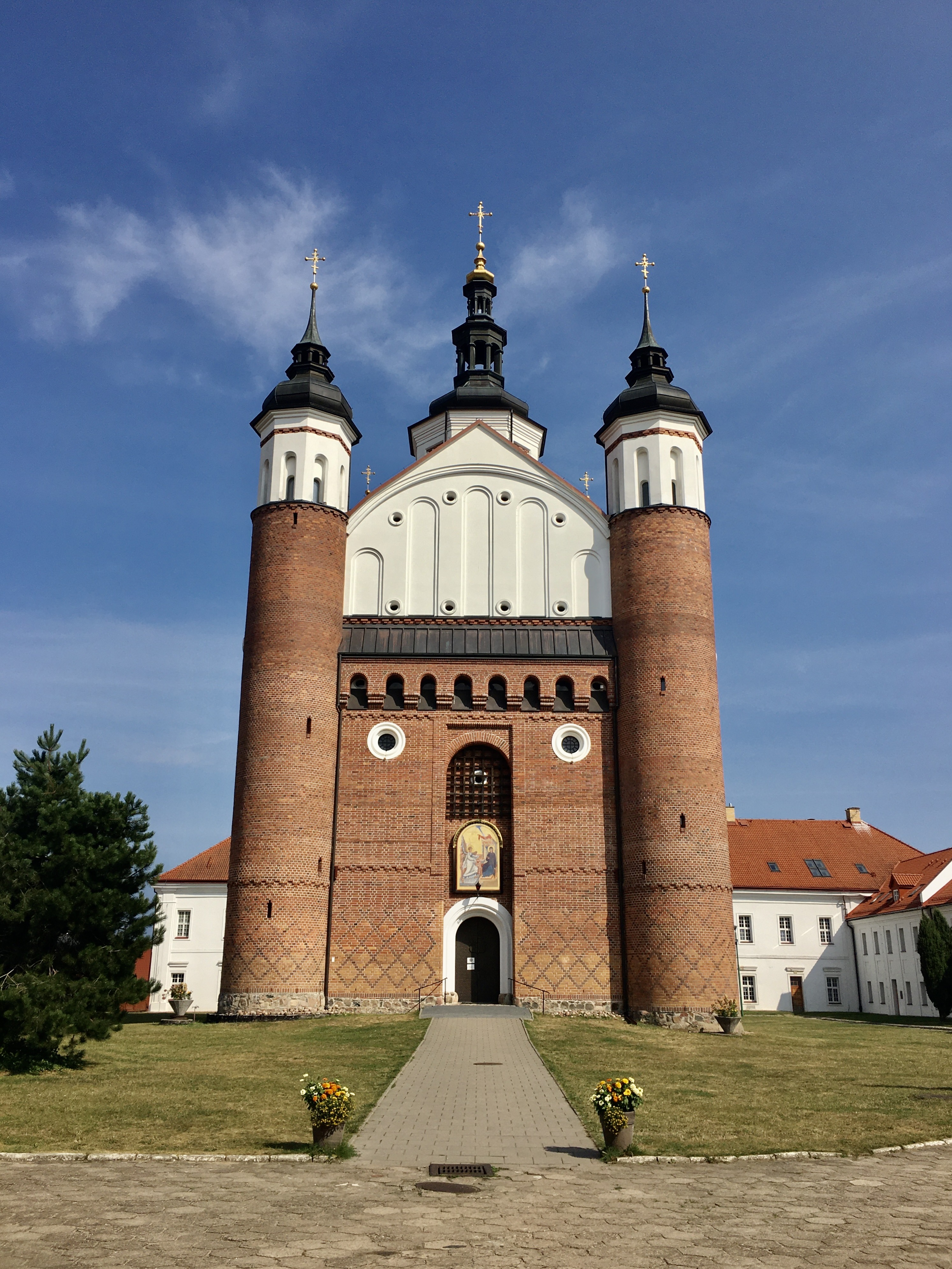
Church of the Annunciation

In the courtyard of the monastery complex is the Church of the Annunciation (1503–1511, destroyed 1944, in the process of being rebuilt since 1985. Surviving original fragments of the original frescoes are currently exhibited in the Archimandrites' Palace. The church is being rebuilt according to the design of architect M. Kuźmienko.

Monastery buildings Baroque, built in the 17th and 18th centuries.

Archimandrites' Palace (built between 1635–1655). Today the palace houses the Supraśl Icon Museum.

The Church of St. John the Theologian (1888)

The Gate-Belltower built in 1752, modeled on the Branicki Palace in Białystok.

The premises of the Supraśl Lavra are the home of the Supraśl Academy, modeled on similar institutions run by the Orthodox Church in Greece today.
