= Majerovce =

- Municipality
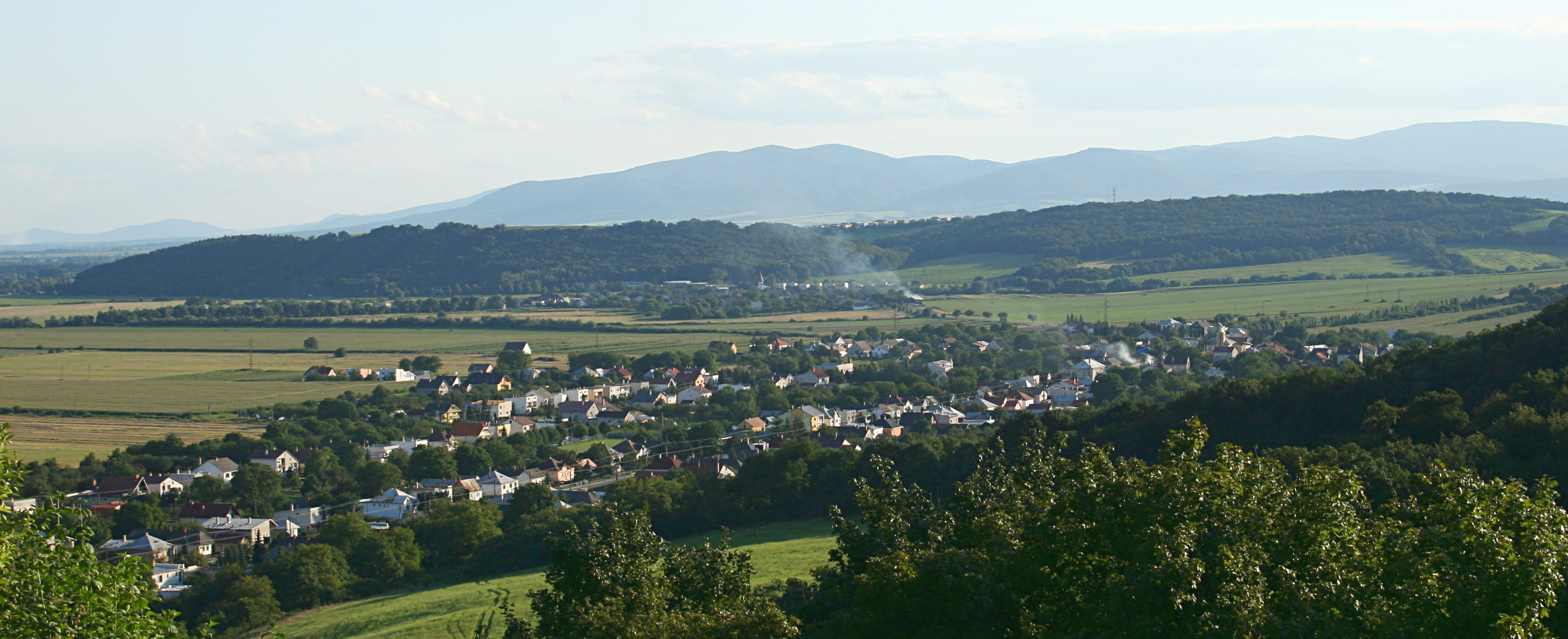

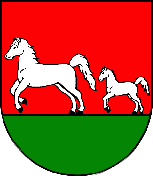
- Flag Coat of arms

- Location of Majerovce in the Prešov Region Location of Majerovce in Slovakia
- Coordinates: 48.90°N 21.72°E
- Country: Slovakia
- Region: Prešov Region
- District: Vranov nad Topľou District
- First mentioned: 1363

Area
  - Total: 3.54 km^{2} (1.37 sq mi)
- Elevation: 132 m (433 ft)

Population (2025)
  - Total: 433
- Time zone: UTC+1 (CET)
  - Summer (DST): UTC+2 (CEST)
- Postal code: 940 9
- Area code: +421 57
- Vehicle registration plate (until 2022): VT
- Website: www.majerovce.sk

Majerovce (Hungarian: Majoros) is a village and municipality in Vranov nad Topľou District in the Prešov Region of eastern Slovakia.

== History ==
In historical records the village was first mentioned in 1363.

== Geography ==
The municipality lies at an altitude of 132 metres (433 ft) and covers an area of 3.54 km^{2} (1.37 sq mi) (2025).

== Population ==
Population statistic (10 years)
Year	1995	2005	2015	2025
Count	457	444	448	433
Difference		−2.84%	+0.90%	−3.34%

Population statistic
Year	2024	2025
Count	436	433
Difference		−0.68%

It has a population of 433 people (31 December 2025).

=== Ethnicity ===
Census 2021 (1+ %)
Ethnicity	Number	Fraction
Slovak	440	97.99%
Rusyn	7	1.55%
Not found out	5	1.11%
Total	449	

In year 2021 was 449 people by ethnicity 440 as Slovak, 7 as Rusyn, 5 as Not found out, 1 as Czech, 1 as Ukrainian, 1 as Russian and 1 as German.

Note on population: The difference values of population numbers in the table "Population statistic" and in the sections "Ethnicity" & "Religion" is caused by the use of various statistical methods.

=== Religion ===
Census 2021 (1+ %)
Religion	Number	Fraction
Roman Catholic Church	339	75.5%
Greek Catholic Church	79	17.59%
None	17	3.79%
Not found out	10	2.23%
Total	449	

In year 2021 was 449 people by religion 339 from Roman Catholic Church, 79 from Greek Catholic Church, 17 from None, 10 from Not found out and 4 from Evangelical Church.
