= Vlača =

- Municipality
- Flag

- Location of Vlača in the Prešov Region Location of Vlača in Slovakia
- Coordinates: 49.05°N 21.53°E
- Country: Slovakia
- Region: Prešov Region
- District: Vranov nad Topľou District
- First mentioned: 1349

Area
  - Total: 4.25 km^{2} (1.64 sq mi)
- Elevation: 182 m (597 ft)

Population (2025)
  - Total: 208
- Time zone: UTC+1 (CET)
  - Summer (DST): UTC+2 (CEST)
- Postal code: 943 1
- Area code: +421 57
- Vehicle registration plate (until 2022): VT
- Website: www.obecvlaca.sk

Vlača (Hungarian: Balázsi, until 1899: Vlacsa) is a village and municipality in Vranov nad Topľou District in the Prešov Region of eastern Slovakia.

== History ==
In historical records the village was first mentioned in 1349.

== Geography ==
The municipality lies at an altitude of 182 metres (597 ft) and covers an area of 4.25 km^{2} (1.64 sq mi) (2025).

== Population ==
Population statistic (10 years)
Year	1995	2005	2015	2025
Count	221	232	234	208
Difference		+4.97%	+0.86%	−11.11%

Population statistic
Year	2024	2025
Count	209	208
Difference		−0.47%

It has a population of 208 people (31 December 2025).

=== Ethnicity ===
Census 2021 (1+ %)
Ethnicity	Number	Fraction
Slovak	220	97.34%
Not found out	4	1.76%
Rusyn	3	1.32%
Total	226	

In year 2021 was 226 people by ethnicity 220 as Slovak, 4 as Not found out, 3 as Rusyn and 2 as Other.

Note on population: The difference values of population numbers in the table "Population statistic" and in the sections "Ethnicity" & "Religion" is caused by the use of various statistical methods.

=== Religion ===
Census 2021 (1+ %)
Religion	Number	Fraction
Greek Catholic Church	104	46.02%
Roman Catholic Church	71	31.42%
Evangelical Church	36	15.93%
None	10	4.42%
Not found out	4	1.77%
Total	226	

In year 2021 was 226 people by religion 104 from Greek Catholic Church, 71 from Roman Catholic Church, 36 from Evangelical Church, 10 from None, 4 from Not found out and 1 from Old Catholic Church.
