= Benkovce =

- Municipality
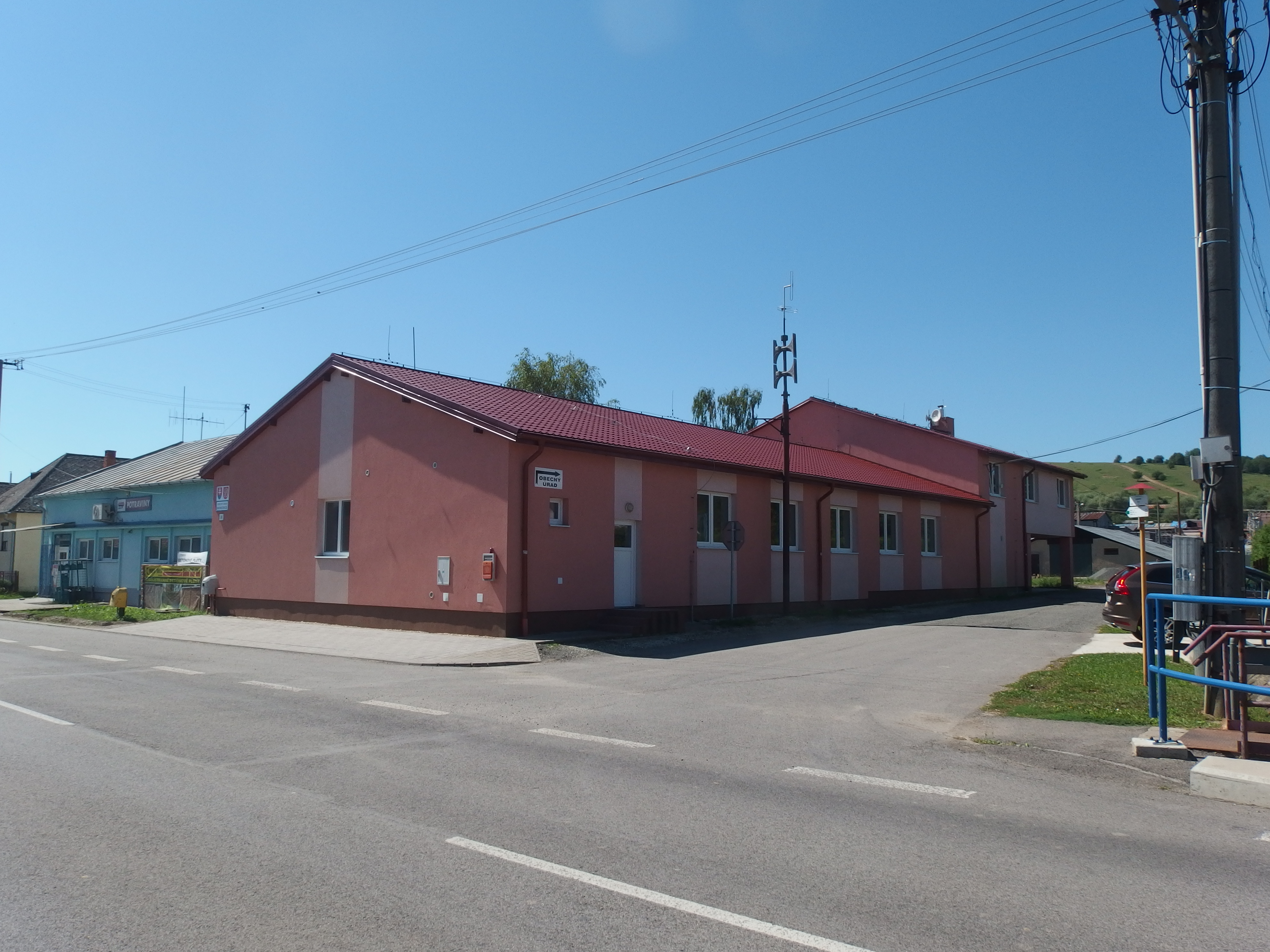

- Flag

- Location of Benkovce in the Prešov Region Location of Benkovce in Slovakia
- Coordinates: 48.95°N 21.72°E
- Country: Slovakia
- Region: Prešov Region
- District: Vranov nad Topľou District
- First mentioned: 1363

Area
  - Total: 8.23 km^{2} (3.18 sq mi)
- Elevation: 138 m (453 ft)

Population (2025)
  - Total: 569
- Time zone: UTC+1 (CET)
  - Summer (DST): UTC+2 (CEST)
- Postal code: 940 2
- Area code: +421 57
- Vehicle registration plate (until 2022): VT
- Website: obecbenkovce.sk

Benkovce (Hungarian: Benkőfalva, until 1899: Benkócz) is a village and municipality in Vranov nad Topľou District in the Prešov Region of eastern Slovakia.

== History ==
The village was first mentioned in historical records in 1363.

== Geography ==
The municipality lies at an altitude of 138 metres (453 ft) and covers an area of 8.23 km^{2} (3.18 sq mi) (2025).

== Population ==
Population statistic (10 years)
Year	1995	2005	2015	2025
Count	559	539	537	569
Difference		−3.57%	−0.37%	+5.95%

Population statistic
Year	2024	2025
Count	567	569
Difference		+0.35%

It has a population of 569 people (31 December 2025).

=== Ethnicity ===
Census 2021 (1+ %)
Ethnicity	Number	Fraction
Slovak	546	98.02%
Romani	26	4.66%
Total	557	

In year 2021 was 557 people by ethnicity 546 as Slovak, 26 as Romani, 5 as Not found out, 2 as Czech, 2 as Rusyn and 1 as Polish.

Note on population: The difference values of population numbers in the table "Population statistic" and in the sections "Ethnicity" & "Religion" is caused by the use of various statistical methods.

=== Religion ===
Census 2021 (1+ %)
Religion	Number	Fraction
Roman Catholic Church	479	86%
Greek Catholic Church	46	8.26%
None	12	2.15%
Jehovah's Witnesses	11	1.97%
Total	557	

In year 2021 was 557 people by religion 479 from Roman Catholic Church, 46 from Greek Catholic Church, 12 from None, 11 from Jehovah's Witnesses, 4 from Not found out, 2 from Eastern Orthodox Church, 2 from Evangelical Church and 1 from Other.

== Genealogical resources ==
The records for genealogical research are available at the state archive "Statny Archiv in Presov, Slovakia"

- Roman Catholic church records (births/marriages/deaths): 1744-1895 (parish B)
- Greek Catholic church records (births/marriages/deaths): 1826-1946 (parish B)

== See also ==
- List of municipalities and towns in Slovakia
