= Rafajovce =

- Municipality
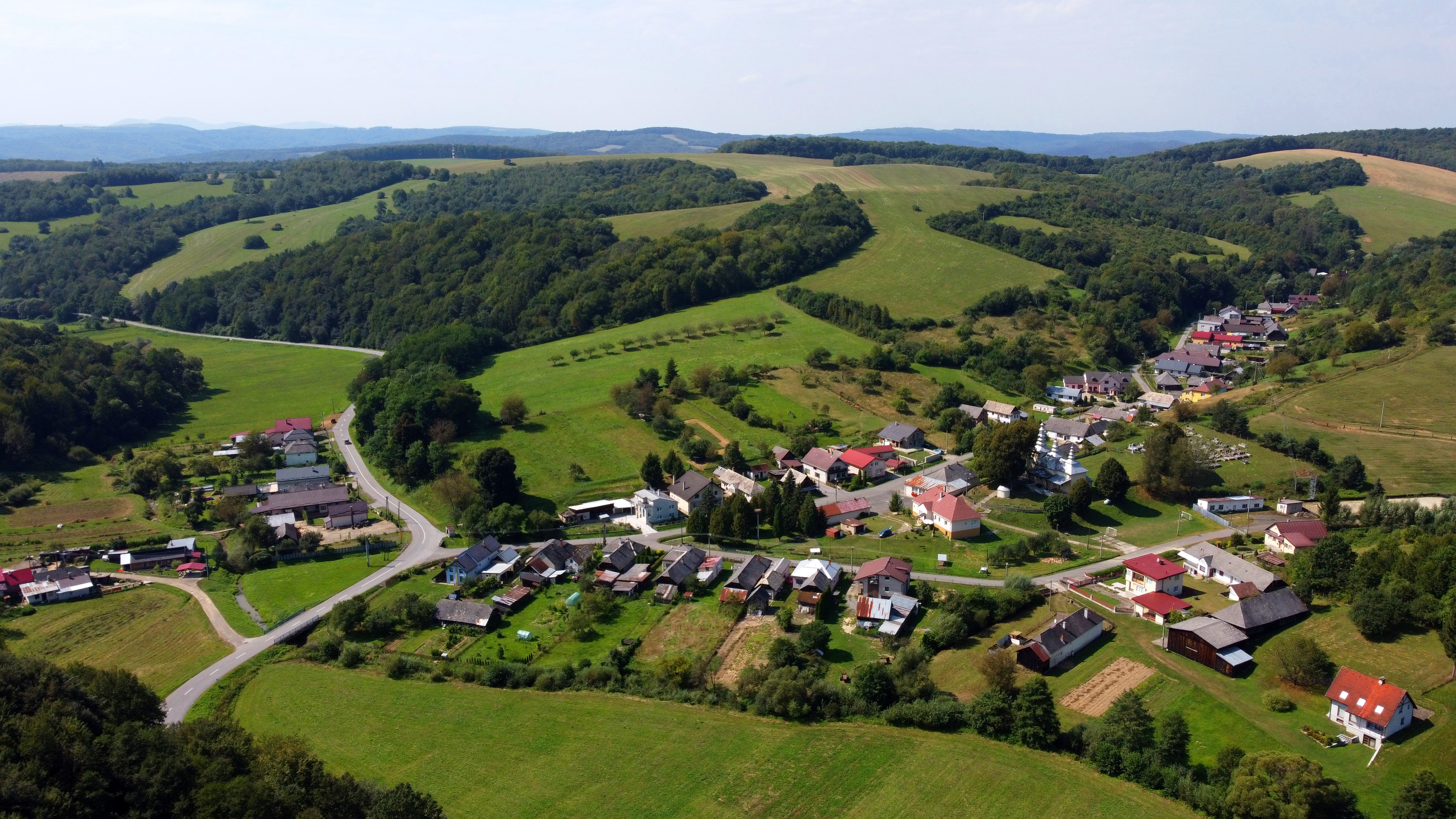

- Flag

- Location of Rafajovce in the Prešov Region Location of Rafajovce in Slovakia
- Coordinates: 49.04°N 21.73°E
- Country: Slovakia
- Region: Prešov Region
- District: Vranov nad Topľou District
- First mentioned: 1596

Area
  - Total: 4.74 km^{2} (1.83 sq mi)
- Elevation: 173 m (568 ft)

Population (2025)
  - Total: 151
- Time zone: UTC+1 (CET)
  - Summer (DST): UTC+2 (CEST)
- Postal code: 940 5
- Area code: +421 57
- Vehicle registration plate (until 2022): VT
- Website: rafajovce.sk

Rafajovce (Hungarian: Máriakút, until 1899: Rafajócz) is a village and municipality in Vranov nad Topľou District in the Prešov Region of eastern Slovakia.

== History ==
In historical records the village was first mentioned in 1596.

== Geography ==
The municipality lies at an altitude of 173 metres (568 ft) and covers an area of 4.74 km^{2} (1.83 sq mi) (2025).

== Population ==
Population statistic (10 years)
Year	1995	2005	2015	2025
Count	180	174	187	151
Difference		−3.33%	+7.47%	−19.25%

Population statistic
Year	2024	2025
Count	159	151
Difference		−5.03%

It has a population of 151 people (31 December 2025).

=== Ethnicity ===
Census 2021 (1+ %)
Ethnicity	Number	Fraction
Slovak	154	93.33%
Rusyn	10	6.06%
Czech	5	3.03%
Hungarian	2	1.21%
Other	2	1.21%
Albanian	2	1.21%
Total	165	

In year 2021 was 165 people by ethnicity 154 as Slovak, 10 as Rusyn, 5 as Czech, 2 as Hungarian, 2 as Other, 2 as Albanian, 1 as Ukrainian, 1 as Romani, 1 as Not found out and 1 as German.

Note on population: The difference values of population numbers in the table "Population statistic" and in the sections "Ethnicity" & "Religion" is caused by the use of various statistical methods.

=== Religion ===
Census 2021 (1+ %)
Religion	Number	Fraction
Greek Catholic Church	127	76.97%
Roman Catholic Church	20	12.12%
None	8	4.85%
Evangelical Church	5	3.03%
Eastern Orthodox Church	4	2.42%
Total	165	

In year 2021 was 165 people by religion 127 from Greek Catholic Church, 20 from Roman Catholic Church, 8 from None, 5 from Evangelical Church, 4 from Eastern Orthodox Church and 1 from Ad hoc movements.
