= Babie =

- Municipality
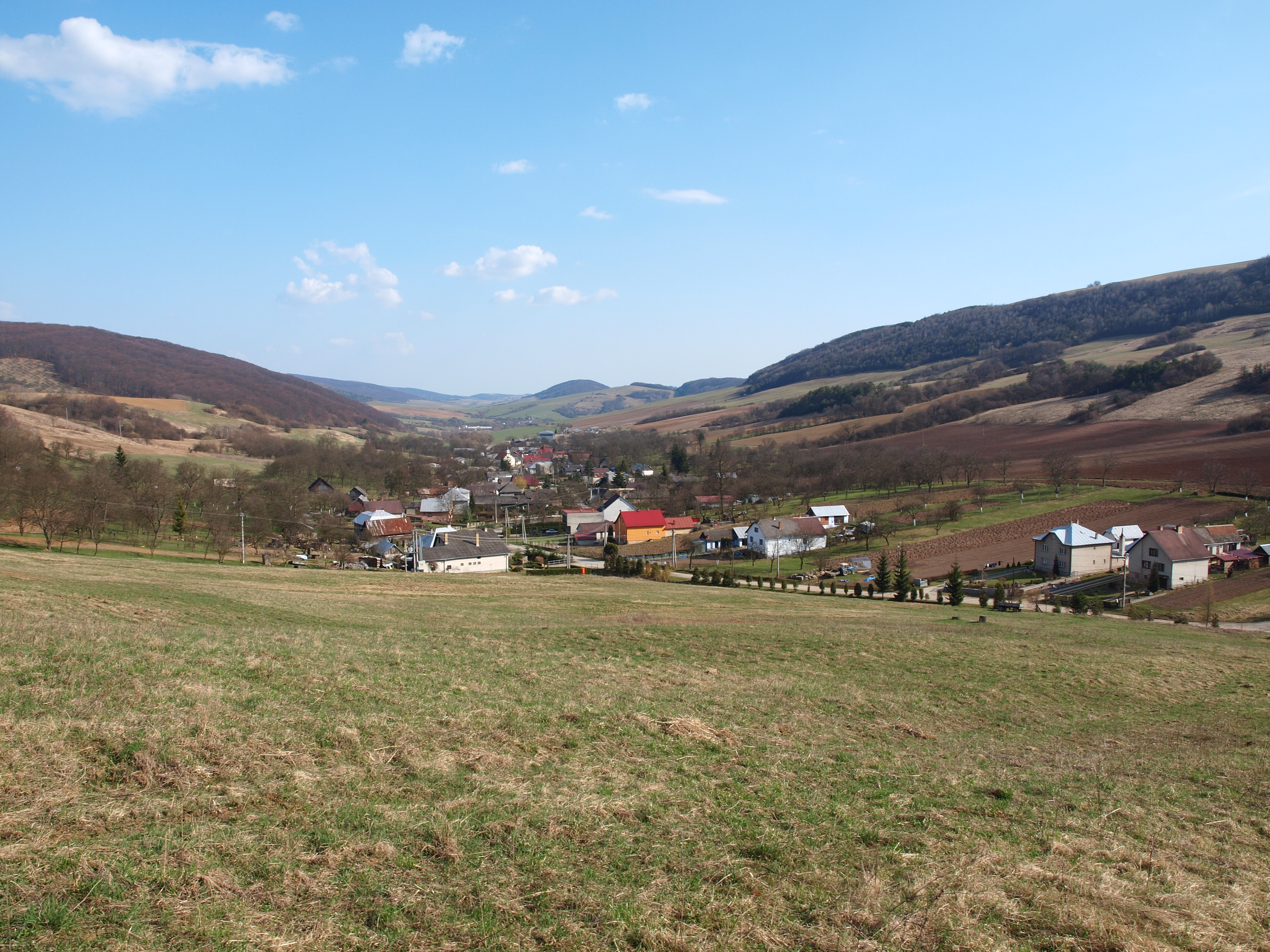

- Flag

- Location of Babie in the Prešov Region Location of Babie in Slovakia
- Coordinates: 49.07°N 21.50°E
- Country: Slovakia
- Region: Prešov Region
- District: Vranov nad Topľou District
- First mentioned: 1330

Government
  - Mayor: Martina Hliboká

Area
  - Total: 7.99 km^{2} (3.08 sq mi)
- Elevation: 217 m (712 ft)

Population (2025)
  - Total: 241
- Time zone: UTC+1 (CET)
  - Summer (DST): UTC+2 (CEST)
- Postal code: 943 1
- Area code: +421 57
- Vehicle registration plate (until 2022): VT

Babie (Hungarian: Bábafalva) is a village and municipality in the Vranov nad Topľou District in the Prešov Region of Slovakia.

== Geography ==
The municipality lies at an altitude of 217 metres (712 ft) and covers an area of 7.99 km^{2} (3.08 sq mi) (2025).

== Population ==
Population statistic (10 years)
Year	1995	2005	2015	2025
Count	241	262	234	241
Difference		+8.71%	−10.68%	+2.99%

Population statistic
Year	2024	2025
Count	238	241
Difference		+1.26%

It has a population of 241 people (31 December 2025).

=== Ethnicity ===
Census 2021 (1+ %)
Ethnicity	Number	Fraction
Slovak	222	96.52%
Not found out	7	3.04%
Total	230	

In year 2021 was 230 people by ethnicity 222 as Slovak, 7 as Not found out, 1 as Romani, 1 as Rusyn and 1 as Polish.

Note on population: The difference values of population numbers in the table "Population statistic" and in the sections "Ethnicity" & "Religion" is caused by the use of various statistical methods.

=== Religion ===
Census 2021 (1+ %)
Religion	Number	Fraction
Evangelical Church	145	63.04%
Roman Catholic Church	59	25.65%
Greek Catholic Church	12	5.22%
Not found out	6	2.61%
None	5	2.17%
Ad hoc movements	3	1.3%
Total	230	

In year 2021 was 230 people by religion 145 from Evangelical Church, 59 from Roman Catholic Church, 12 from Greek Catholic Church, 6 from Not found out, 5 from None and 3 from Ad hoc movements.

== Genealogical resources ==
The records for genealogical research are available at the state archive in Prešov (Slovak: Štátny archív v Prešove).

- Roman Catholic church records (births/marriages/deaths): 1766-1897
- Greek Catholic church records (births/marriages/deaths): 1847-1939
- Lutheran church records (births/marriages/deaths): 1766-1895
- Census records 1869 of Babie are available at the state archive.

== See also ==
- List of municipalities and towns in Slovakia
