= Remeniny =

- Municipality
- Flag

- Location of Remeniny in the Prešov Region Location of Remeniny in Slovakia
- Coordinates: 49.03°N 21.55°E
- Country: Slovakia
- Region: Prešov Region
- District: Vranov nad Topľou District
- First mentioned: 1356

Area
  - Total: 10.59 km^{2} (4.09 sq mi)
- Elevation: 184 m (604 ft)

Population (2025)
  - Total: 288
- Time zone: UTC+1 (CET)
  - Summer (DST): UTC+2 (CEST)
- Postal code: 943 1
- Area code: +421 57
- Vehicle registration plate (until 2022): VT
- Website: www.obecremeniny.sk

Remeniny (Hungarian: Remenye) is a village and municipality in Vranov nad Topľou District in the Prešov Region of eastern Slovakia.

== History ==
In historical records the village was first mentioned in 1356.

== Geography ==
The municipality lies at an altitude of 184 metres (604 ft) and covers an area of 10.59 km^{2} (4.09 sq mi) (2025).

== Population ==
Population statistic (10 years)
Year	1995	2005	2015	2025
Count	273	295	301	288
Difference		+8.05%	+2.03%	−4.31%

Population statistic
Year	2024	2025
Count	282	288
Difference		+2.12%

It has a population of 288 people (31 December 2025).

=== Ethnicity ===
Census 2021 (1+ %)
Ethnicity	Number	Fraction
Slovak	271	99.26%
Rusyn	3	1.09%
Total	273	

In year 2021 was 273 people by ethnicity 271 as Slovak, 3 as Rusyn, 1 as Czech, 1 as Serbian and 1 as Not found out.

Note on population: The difference values of population numbers in the table "Population statistic" and in the sections "Ethnicity" & "Religion" is caused by the use of various statistical methods.

=== Religion ===
Census 2021 (1+ %)
Religion	Number	Fraction
Greek Catholic Church	158	57.88%
Roman Catholic Church	58	21.25%
Evangelical Church	29	10.62%
None	16	5.86%
Not found out	6	2.2%
Jehovah's Witnesses	3	1.1%
Total	273	

In year 2021 was 273 people by religion 158 from Greek Catholic Church, 58 from Roman Catholic Church, 29 from Evangelical Church, 16 from None, 6 from Not found out, 3 from Jehovah's Witnesses, 1 from Calvinist Church, 1 from Eastern Orthodox Church and 1 from Paganism and natural spirituality.
