= Juskova Voľa =

- Municipality
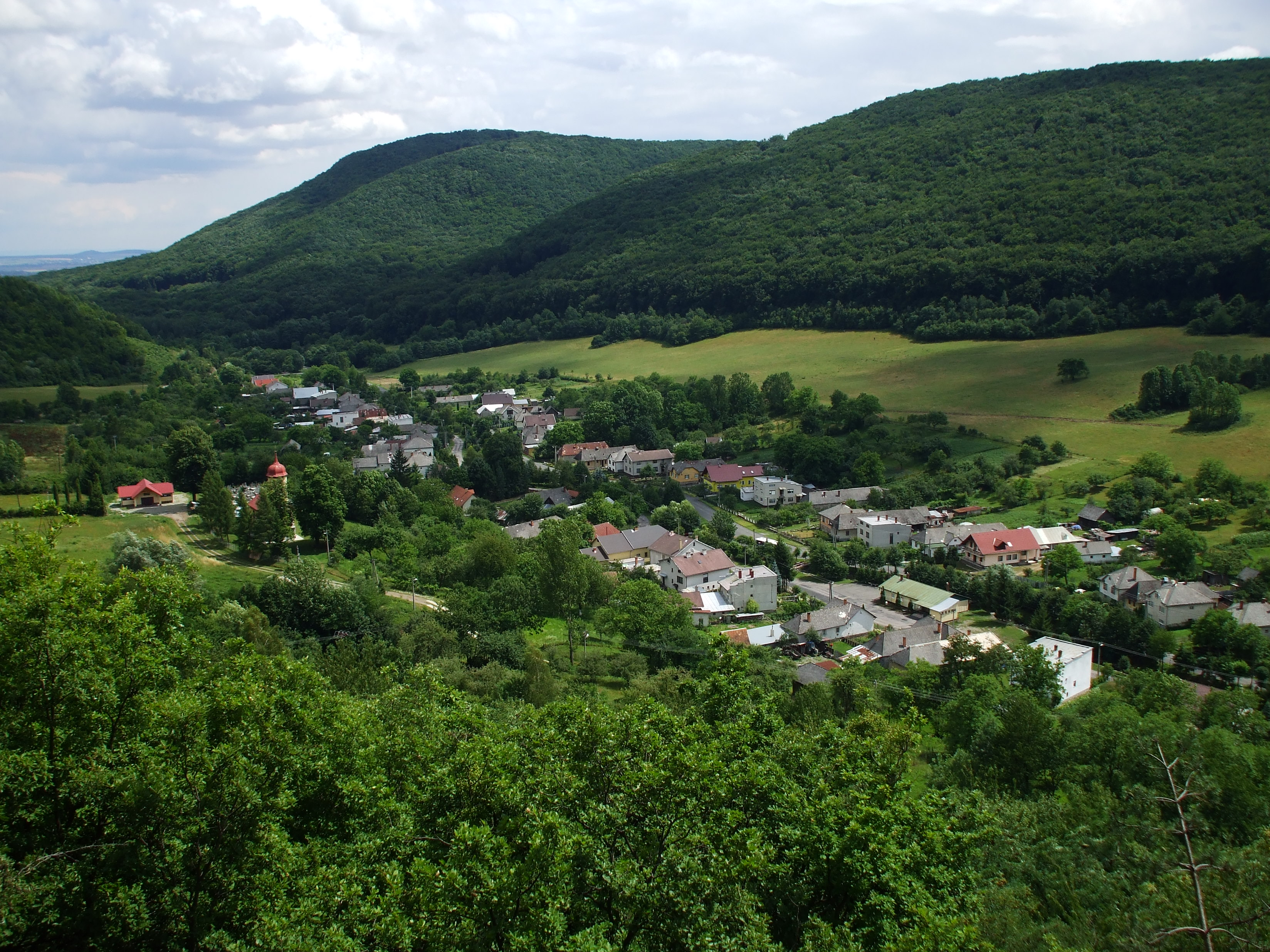

- Flag

- Location of Juskova Voľa in the Prešov Region Location of Juskova Voľa in Slovakia
- Coordinates: 48.88°N 21.57°E
- Country: Slovakia
- Region: Prešov Region
- District: Vranov nad Topľou District
- First mentioned: 1390

Area
  - Total: 18.14 km^{2} (7.00 sq mi)
- Elevation: 248 m (814 ft)

Population (2025)
  - Total: 279
- Time zone: UTC+1 (CET)
  - Summer (DST): UTC+2 (CEST)
- Postal code: 941 2
- Area code: +421 57
- Vehicle registration plate (until 2022): VT
- Website: obecjuskovavola.sk

Juskova Voľa (Hungarian: Józsefvölgy, until 1899: Juszko-Volya; Rusyn: Юскова Воля) is a village and municipality in Vranov nad Topľou District in the Prešov Region of eastern Slovakia.

== History ==
In historical records the village was first mentioned in 1390.

== Geography ==
The municipality lies at an altitude of 248 metres (814 ft) and covers an area of 18.14 km^{2} (7.00 sq mi) (2025).

== Population ==
Population statistic (10 years)
Year	1995	2005	2015	2025
Count	278	320	310	279
Difference		+15.10%	−3.12%	−10%

Population statistic
Year	2024	2025
Count	287	279
Difference		−2.78%

It has a population of 279 people (31 December 2025).

=== Ethnicity ===
Census 2021 (1+ %)
Ethnicity	Number	Fraction
Slovak	291	98.31%
Rusyn	6	2.02%
Not found out	3	1.01%
Total	296	

In year 2021 was 296 people by ethnicity 291 as Slovak, 6 as Rusyn, 3 as Not found out, 1 as Czech and 1 as Ukrainian.

Note on population: The difference values of population numbers in the table "Population statistic" and in the sections "Ethnicity" & "Religion" is caused by the use of various statistical methods.

=== Religion ===
Census 2021 (1+ %)
Religion	Number	Fraction
Greek Catholic Church	164	55.41%
Roman Catholic Church	108	36.49%
None	13	4.39%
Evangelical Church	4	1.35%
Not found out	3	1.01%
Total	296	

In year 2021 was 296 people by religion 164 from Greek Catholic Church, 108 from Roman Catholic Church, 13 from None, 4 from Evangelical Church, 3 from Not found out, 1 from Calvinist Church, 1 from Eastern Orthodox Church, 1 from Other and not ascertained christian church and 1 from Ad hoc movements.

== Genealogical resources ==
The records for genealogical research are available at the state archive "Statny Archiv in Presov, Slovakia"

- Roman Catholic church records (births/marriages/deaths): 1789-1899 (parish B)
- Greek Catholic church records (births/marriages/deaths): 1831-1894 (parish B)

== See also ==
- List of municipalities and towns in Slovakia
