= Dlhé Klčovo =

- Municipality
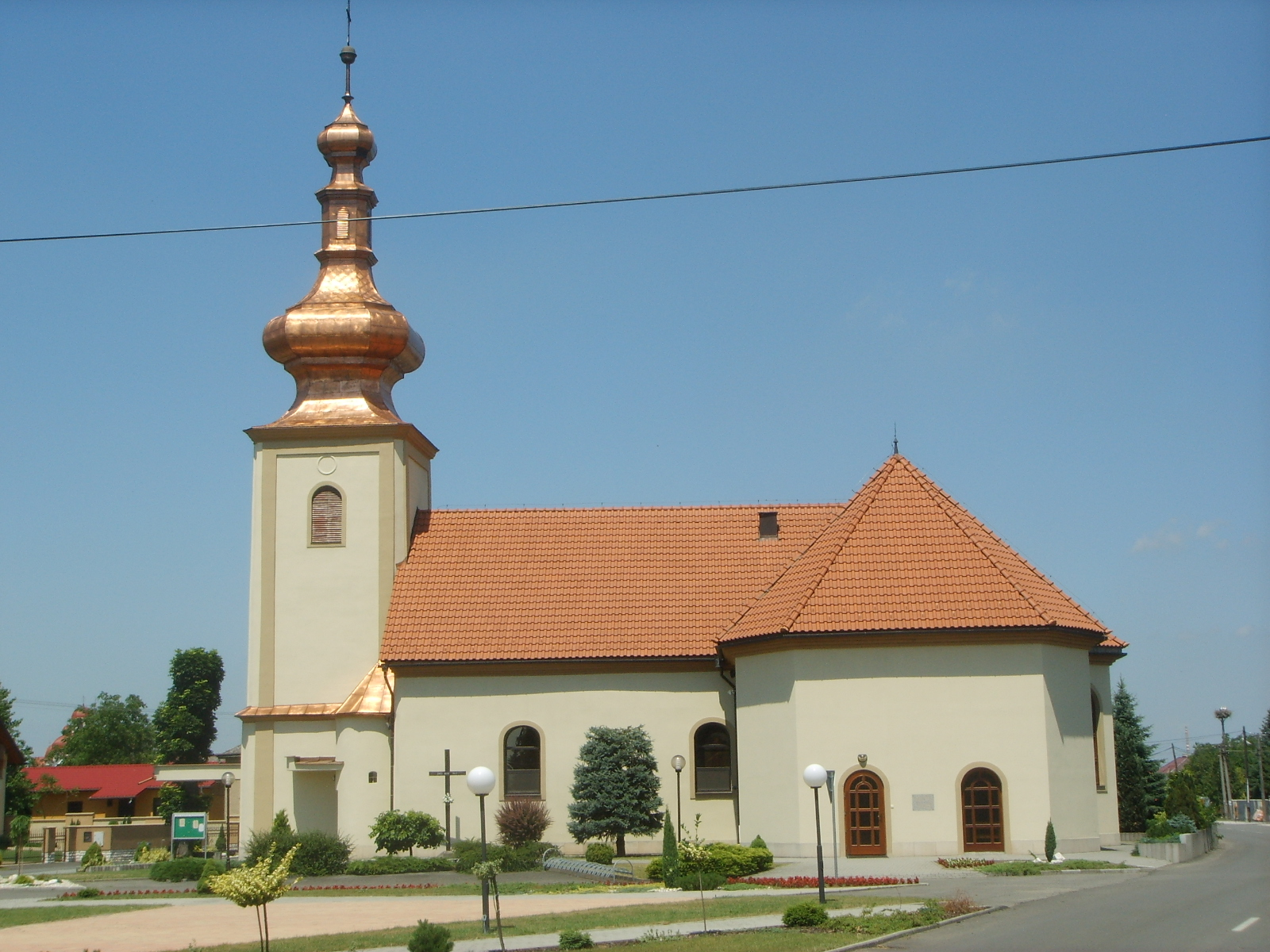

- Flag

- Location of Dlhé Klčovo in the Prešov Region Location of Dlhé Klčovo in Slovakia
- Coordinates: 48.80°N 21.75°E
- Country: Slovakia
- Region: Prešov Region
- District: Vranov nad Topľou District
- First mentioned: 1270

Area
  - Total: 10.21 km^{2} (3.94 sq mi)
- Elevation: 114 m (374 ft)

Population (2025)
  - Total: 1,342
- Time zone: UTC+1 (CET)
  - Summer (DST): UTC+2 (CEST)
- Postal code: 941 3
- Area code: +421 57
- Vehicle registration plate (until 2022): VT
- Website: www.dlheklcovo.sk

Dlhé Klčovo (Hungarian: Kolcsmező, until 1899: Kolcs-Hosszúmező) is a village and municipality in Vranov nad Topľou District in the Prešov Region of eastern Slovakia.

== History ==
In historical records the village was first mentioned in 1270.

== Geography ==
The municipality lies at an altitude of 114 metres (374 ft) and covers an area of 10.21 km^{2} (3.94 sq mi) (2025).

== Population ==
Population statistic (10 years)
Year	1995	2005	2015	2025
Count	1362	1434	1400	1342
Difference		+5.28%	−2.37%	−4.14%

Population statistic
Year	2024	2025
Count	1347	1342
Difference		−0.37%

It has a population of 1342 people (31 December 2025).

=== Ethnicity ===
Census 2021 (1+ %)
Ethnicity	Number	Fraction
Slovak	1315	95.84%
Not found out	57	4.15%
Total	1372	

In year 2021 was 1372 people by ethnicity 1315 as Slovak, 57 as Not found out, 9 as Romani, 5 as Ukrainian, 4 as Czech, 3 as Rusyn, 1 as Hungarian and 1 as Canadian.

Note on population: The difference values of population numbers in the table "Population statistic" and in the sections "Ethnicity" & "Religion" is caused by the use of various statistical methods.

=== Religion ===
Census 2021 (1+ %)
Religion	Number	Fraction
Roman Catholic Church	881	64.21%
Greek Catholic Church	389	28.35%
Not found out	50	3.64%
None	30	2.19%
Total	1372	

In year 2021 was 1372 people by religion 881 from Roman Catholic Church, 389 from Greek Catholic Church, 50 from Not found out, 30 from None, 10 from Evangelical Church, 5 from Apostolic Church, 3 from Eastern Orthodox Church, 2 from Calvinist Church, 1 from United Methodist Church and 1 from Ad hoc movements.

== See also ==
- List of municipalities and towns in Slovakia

== Genealogical resources ==
The records for genealogical research are available at the state archive "Statny Archiv in Presov, Slovakia"

- Roman Catholic church records (births/marriages/deaths): 1827-1895 (parish B)
- Greek Catholic church records (births/marriages/deaths): 1882-1895 (parish B)
