= Ondavské Matiašovce =

- Municipality
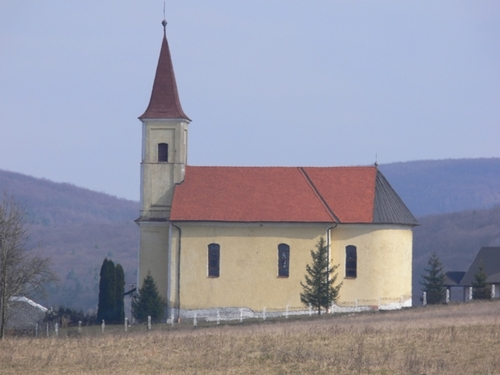

- Flag

- Location of Ondavské Matiašovce in the Prešov Region Location of Ondavské Matiašovce in Slovakia
- Coordinates: 48.93°N 21.75°E
- Country: Slovakia
- Region: Prešov Region
- District: Vranov nad Topľou District
- First mentioned: 1363

Area
  - Total: 10.29 km^{2} (3.97 sq mi)
- Elevation: 134 m (440 ft)

Population (2025)
  - Total: 818
- Time zone: UTC+1 (CET)
  - Summer (DST): UTC+2 (CEST)
- Postal code: 940 1
- Area code: +421 57
- Vehicle registration plate (until 2022): VT
- Website: www.ondavskematiasovce.sk

Ondavské Matiašovce (Hungarian: Zemplénmátyás, until 1899: Matyasócz) is a village and municipality in Vranov nad Topľou District in the Prešov Region of eastern Slovakia.

== History ==
In historical records the village was first mentioned in 1363.

Many families from Ondavské Matiašovce and neighboring villages of Benkovce and Tovarne would migrate from the Slovakia to the United States in the early 20th century. The Dudas family has been researched as a known family to have strong genealogical roots in these three villages. An example would be Michael Dudas (1882-1938), who migrated in the early 20th century to settle in Slovak and Polish neighborhoods of Pittsburgh, Pennsylvania. His wife, Maria, and young child, Paul, would follow shortly after. Migration from villages in Slovakia, like Ondavské Matišsovce, were common around the fall of the Austro-Hungarian Empire. (As researched by Robert J. Dudas)

== Geography ==
The municipality lies at an altitude of 134 metres (440 ft) and covers an area of 10.29 km^{2} (3.97 sq mi) (2025).

== Population ==
Population statistic (10 years)
Year	1995	2005	2015	2025
Count	765	803	825	818
Difference		+4.96%	+2.73%	−0.84%

Population statistic
Year	2024	2025
Count	803	818
Difference		+1.86%

It has a population of 818 people (31 December 2025).

=== Ethnicity ===
Census 2021 (1+ %)
Ethnicity	Number	Fraction
Slovak	757	94.03%
Not found out	38	4.72%
Romani	34	4.22%
Total	805	

In year 2021 was 805 people by ethnicity 757 as Slovak, 38 as Not found out, 34 as Romani, 6 as Czech, 2 as Rusyn, 2 as English and 1 as Hungarian.

Note on population: The difference values of population numbers in the table "Population statistic" and in the sections "Ethnicity" & "Religion" is caused by the use of various statistical methods.

=== Religion ===
Census 2021 (1+ %)
Religion	Number	Fraction
Roman Catholic Church	693	86.09%
Greek Catholic Church	55	6.83%
Not found out	29	3.6%
None	22	2.73%
Total	805	

In year 2021 was 805 people by religion 693 from Roman Catholic Church, 55 from Greek Catholic Church, 29 from Not found out, 22 from None, 3 from Evangelical Church, 2 from Eastern Orthodox Church and 1 from Jehovah's Witnesses.
