= Nižný Kručov =

- Municipality
- Flag

- Location of Nižný Kručov in the Prešov Region Location of Nižný Kručov in Slovakia
- Coordinates: 48.92°N 21.67°E
- Country: Slovakia
- Region: Prešov Region
- District: Vranov nad Topľou District
- First mentioned: 1327

Area
  - Total: 3.70 km^{2} (1.43 sq mi)
- Elevation: 134 m (440 ft)

Population (2025)
  - Total: 379
- Time zone: UTC+1 (CET)
  - Summer (DST): UTC+2 (CEST)
- Postal code: 930 1
- Area code: +421 57
- Vehicle registration plate (until 2022): VT
- Website: www.niznykrucov.sk

Nižný Kručov (Hungarian: Magyarkrucsó) is a village and municipality in Vranov nad Topľou District in the Prešov Region of eastern Slovakia.

== History ==
In historical records the village was first mentioned in 1327.

== Geography ==
The municipality lies at an altitude of 134 metres (440 ft) and covers an area of 3.70 km^{2} (1.43 sq mi) (2025).

== Population ==
Population statistic (10 years)
Year	1995	2005	2015	2025
Count	388	386	411	379
Difference		−0.51%	+6.47%	−7.78%

Population statistic
Year	2024	2025
Count	386	379
Difference		−1.81%

It has a population of 379 people (31 December 2025).

=== Ethnicity ===
Census 2021 (1+ %)
Ethnicity	Number	Fraction
Slovak	375	96.89%
Not found out	8	2.06%
Rusyn	5	1.29%
Total	387	

In year 2021 was 387 people by ethnicity 375 as Slovak, 8 as Not found out, 5 as Rusyn, 3 as Czech and 2 as Other.

Note on population: The difference values of population numbers in the table "Population statistic" and in the sections "Ethnicity" & "Religion" is caused by the use of various statistical methods.

=== Religion ===
Census 2021 (1+ %)
Religion	Number	Fraction
Roman Catholic Church	245	63.31%
Evangelical Church	69	17.83%
Greek Catholic Church	31	8.01%
None	21	5.43%
Not found out	8	2.07%
Jehovah's Witnesses	6	1.55%
Christian Congregations in Slovakia	6	1.55%
Total	387	

In year 2021 was 387 people by religion 245 from Roman Catholic Church, 69 from Evangelical Church, 31 from Greek Catholic Church, 21 from None, 8 from Not found out, 6 from Jehovah's Witnesses, 6 from Christian Congregations in Slovakia and 1 from Eastern Orthodox Church.
