= Detrík =

Municipality of Slovakia

- Municipality
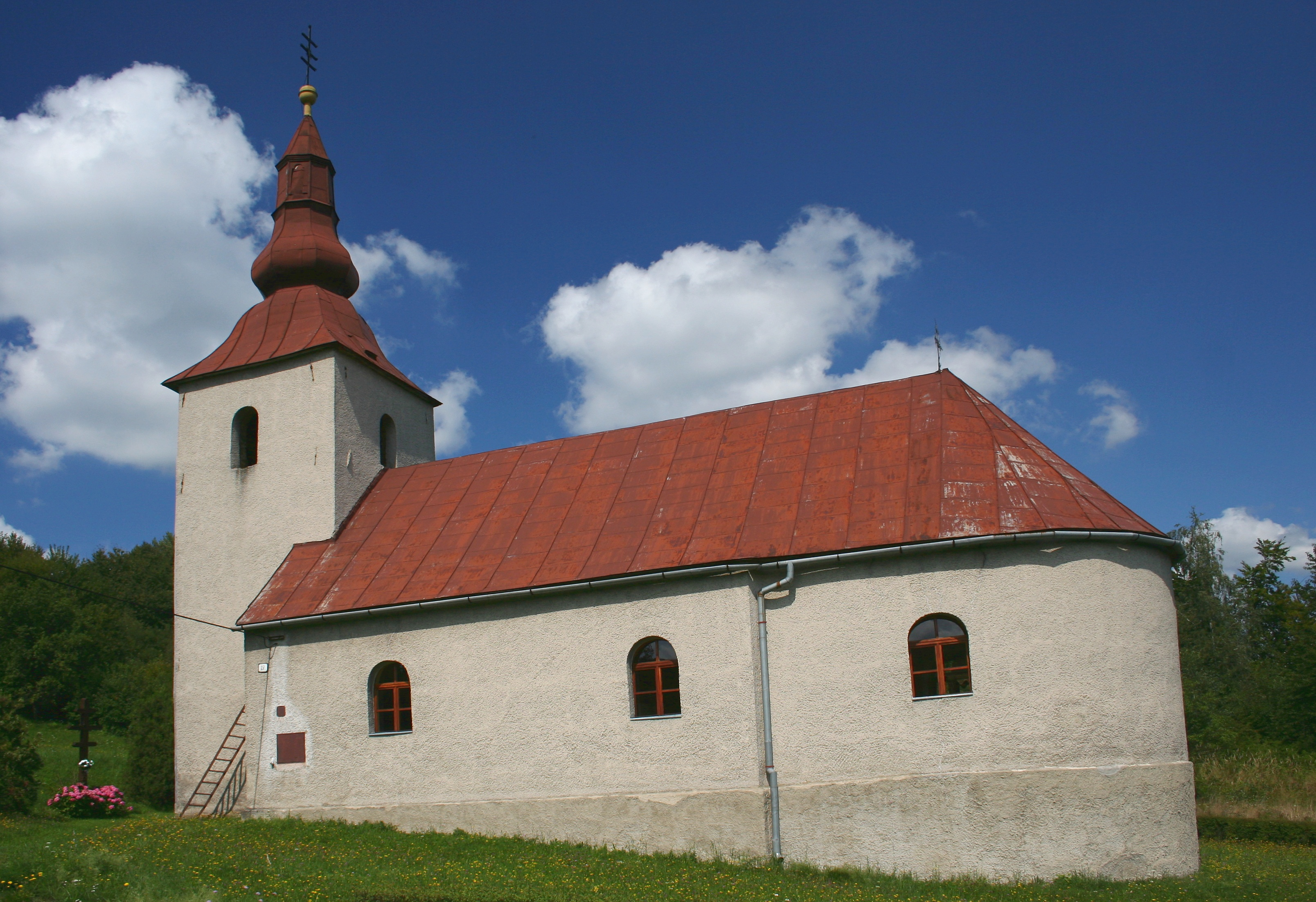

- Flag

- Location of Detrík in the Prešov Region Location of Detrík in Slovakia
- Coordinates: 49.04°N 21.62°E
- Country: Slovakia
- Region: Prešov Region
- District: Vranov nad Topľou District
- First mentioned: 1363

Area
  - Total: 9.52 km^{2} (3.68 sq mi)
- Elevation: 391 m (1,283 ft)

Population (2025)
  - Total: 46
- Time zone: UTC+1 (CET)
  - Summer (DST): UTC+2 (CEST)
- Postal code: 943 1
- Area code: +421 57
- Vehicle registration plate (until 2022): VT
- Website: www.obecdetrik.sk

Detrík (Hungarian: Detre) is a village and municipality in Vranov nad Topľou District in the Prešov Region of eastern Slovakia.

== History ==
In historical records the village was first mentioned in 1363.

== Geography ==
The municipality lies at an altitude of 391 metres (1,283 ft) and covers an area of 9.52 km^{2} (3.68 sq mi) (2025).

== Population ==
Population statistic (10 years)
Year	1995	2005	2015	2025
Count	58	51	53	46
Difference		−12.06%	+3.92%	−13.20%

Population statistic
Year	2024	2025
Count	49	46
Difference		−6.12%

It has a population of 46 people (31 December 2025).

=== Ethnicity ===
Census 2021 (1+ %)
Ethnicity	Number	Fraction
Slovak	54	100%
Rusyn	1	1.85%
Other	1	1.85%
Total	54	

In year 2021 was 54 people by ethnicity 54 as Slovak, 1 as Rusyn and 1 as Other.

Note on population: The difference values of population numbers in the table "Population statistic" and in the sections "Ethnicity" & "Religion" is caused by the use of various statistical methods.

=== Religion ===
Census 2021 (1+ %)
Religion	Number	Fraction
Greek Catholic Church	44	81.48%
Roman Catholic Church	7	12.96%
None	3	5.56%
Total	54	

In year 2021 was 54 people by religion 44 from Greek Catholic Church, 7 from Roman Catholic Church and 3 from None.

== See also ==
- List of municipalities and towns in Slovakia

== Genealogical resources ==
The records for genealogical research are available at the state archive "Statny Archiv in Presov, Slovakia"

- Roman Catholic church records (births/marriages/deaths): 1764-1919 (parish B)
- Greek Catholic church records (births/marriages/deaths): 1835-1848 (parish B)
