= Jastrabie nad Topľou =

- Municipality
- Flag

- Location of Jastrabie nad Topľou in the Prešov Region Location of Jastrabie nad Topľou in Slovakia
- Coordinates: 48.94°N 21.60°E
- Country: Slovakia
- Region: Prešov Region
- District: Vranov nad Topľou District
- First mentioned: 1363

Area
  - Total: 6.77 km^{2} (2.61 sq mi)
- Elevation: 141 m (463 ft)

Population (2025)
  - Total: 492
- Time zone: UTC+1 (CET)
  - Summer (DST): UTC+2 (CEST)
- Postal code: 943 5
- Area code: +421 57
- Vehicle registration plate (until 2022): VT
- Website: www.jastrabie.sk

Jastrabie nad Topľou (Hungarian: Tapolybánya, until 1899: Tót-Jesztreb) is a village and municipality in Vranov nad Topľou District in the Prešov Region of eastern Slovakia.

== History ==
In historical records the village was first mentioned in 1363.

== Geography ==
The municipality lies at an altitude of 141 metres (463 ft) and covers an area of 6.77 km^{2} (2.61 sq mi) (2025).

== Population ==
Population statistic (10 years)
Year	1995	2005	2015	2025
Count	377	406	452	492
Difference		+7.69%	+11.33%	+8.84%

Population statistic
Year	2024	2025
Count	497	492
Difference		−1.00%

It has a population of 492 people (31 December 2025).

=== Ethnicity ===
Census 2021 (1+ %)
Ethnicity	Number	Fraction
Slovak	421	86.44%
Romani	167	34.29%
Not found out	19	3.9%
Czech	6	1.23%
Total	487	

In year 2021 was 487 people by ethnicity 421 as Slovak, 167 as Romani, 19 as Not found out, 6 as Czech, 2 as Ukrainian, 1 as Rusyn and 1 as Other.

Note on population: The difference values of population numbers in the table "Population statistic" and in the sections "Ethnicity" & "Religion" is caused by the use of various statistical methods.

=== Religion ===
Census 2021 (1+ %)
Religion	Number	Fraction
Greek Catholic Church	223	45.79%
Roman Catholic Church	184	37.78%
None	38	7.8%
Evangelical Church	27	5.54%
Not found out	14	2.87%
Total	487	

In year 2021 was 487 people by religion 223 from Greek Catholic Church, 184 from Roman Catholic Church, 38 from None, 27 from Evangelical Church, 14 from Not found out and 1 from Eastern Orthodox Church.

== Genealogical resources ==
The records for genealogical research are available at the state archive "Statny Archiv in Presov, Slovakia"

- Roman Catholic church records (births/marriages/deaths): 1769-1910 (parish B)
- Greek Catholic church records (births/marriages/deaths): 1852-1940 (parish B)
- Lutheran church records (births/marriages/deaths): 1830-1902 (parish B)

== See also ==
- List of municipalities and towns in Slovakia
