= Skrabské =

- Municipality
- Flag

- Location of Skrabské in the Prešov Region Location of Skrabské in Slovakia
- Coordinates: 49.02°N 21.58°E
- Country: Slovakia
- Region: Prešov Region
- District: Vranov nad Topľou District
- First mentioned: 1321

Area
  - Total: 11.03 km^{2} (4.26 sq mi)
- Elevation: 160 m (520 ft)

Population (2025)
  - Total: 779
- Time zone: UTC+1 (CET)
  - Summer (DST): UTC+2 (CEST)
- Postal code: 943 3
- Area code: +421 57
- Vehicle registration plate (until 2022): VT
- Website: obecskrabske.sk

Skrabské (Hungarian: Tapolymogyorós, until 1899: Mogyoróska) is a village and municipality in Vranov nad Topľou District in the Prešov Region of eastern Slovakia.

== History ==
In historical records the village was first mentioned in 1321.

== Geography ==
The municipality lies at an altitude of 160 metres (520 ft) and covers an area of 11.03 km^{2} (4.26 sq mi) (2025).

== Population ==
Population statistic (10 years)
Year	1995	2005	2015	2025
Count	641	735	780	779
Difference		+14.66%	+6.12%	−0.12%

Population statistic
Year	2024	2025
Count	773	779
Difference		+0.77%

It has a population of 779 people (31 December 2025).

=== Ethnicity ===
Census 2021 (1+ %)
Ethnicity	Number	Fraction
Slovak	749	96.64%
Romani	97	12.51%
Not found out	11	1.41%
Total	775	

In year 2021 was 775 people by ethnicity 749 as Slovak, 97 as Romani, 11 as Not found out, 6 as Other, 3 as Rusyn and 1 as Czech.

Note on population: The difference values of population numbers in the table "Population statistic" and in the sections "Ethnicity" & "Religion" is caused by the use of various statistical methods.

=== Religion ===
Census 2021 (1+ %)
Religion	Number	Fraction
Roman Catholic Church	631	81.42%
Greek Catholic Church	74	9.55%
None	39	5.03%
Evangelical Church	24	3.1%
Total	775	

In year 2021 was 775 people by religion 631 from Roman Catholic Church, 74 from Greek Catholic Church, 39 from None, 24 from Evangelical Church, 5 from Not found out, 1 from Eastern Orthodox Church and 1 from Ad hoc movements.
