= Kvakovce =

- Municipality
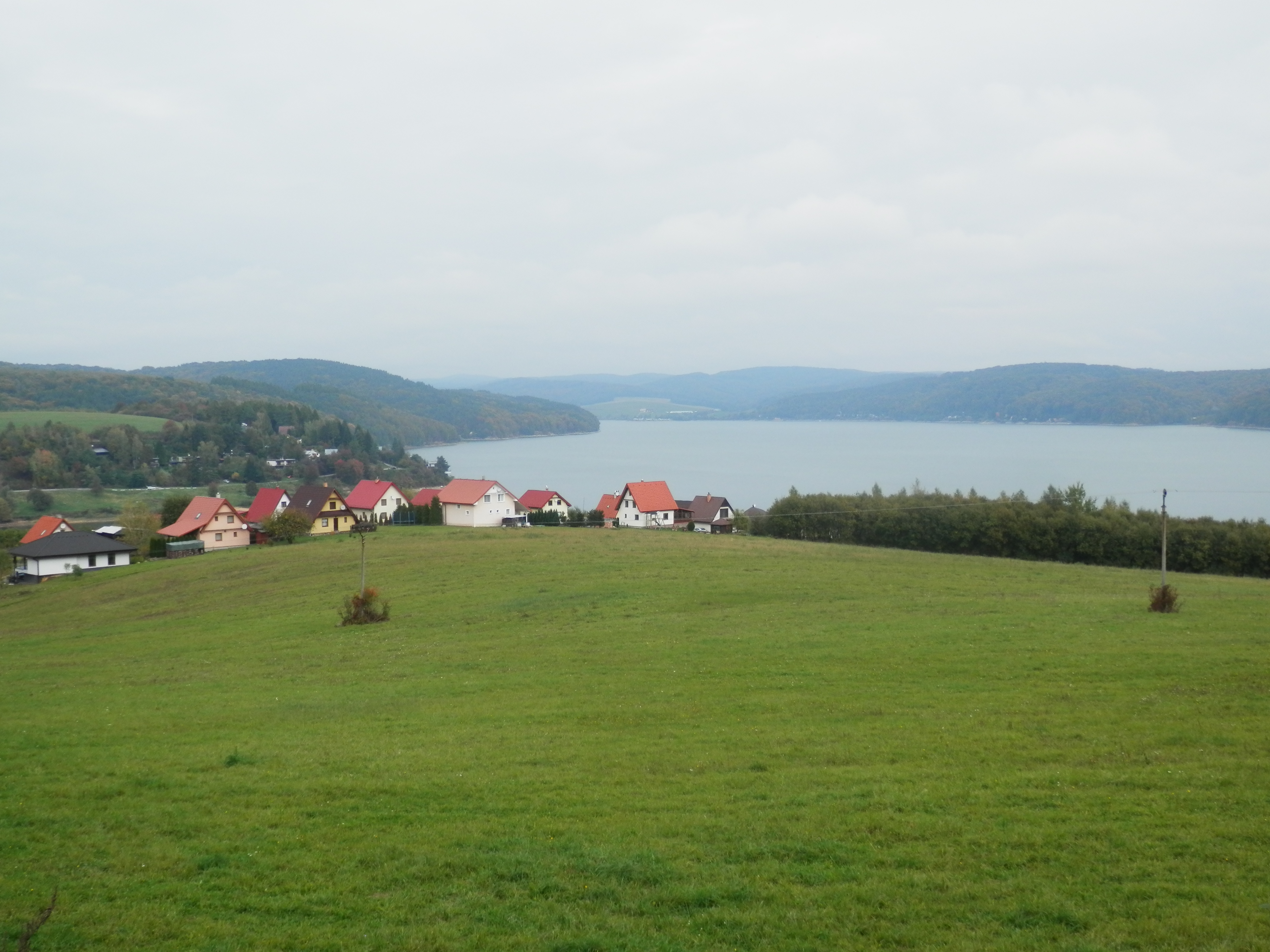

- Flag

- Location of Kvakovce in the Prešov Region Location of Kvakovce in Slovakia
- Coordinates: 48.98°N 21.68°E
- Country: Slovakia
- Region: Prešov Region
- District: Vranov nad Topľou District
- First mentioned: 1345

Area
  - Total: 33.74 km^{2} (13.03 sq mi)
- Elevation: 217 m (712 ft)

Population (2025)
  - Total: 449
- Time zone: UTC+1 (CET)
  - Summer (DST): UTC+2 (CEST)
- Postal code: 940 2
- Area code: +421 57
- Vehicle registration plate (until 2022): VT
- Website: www.domasacity.sk/sk/obce/kvakovce/

Kvakovce (Hungarian: Nagykőpatak, until 1899: Kvakócz) is a village and municipality in Vranov nad Topľou District in the Prešov Region of eastern Slovakia.

== History ==
In historical records the village was first mentioned in 1345.

== Geography ==
The municipality lies at an altitude of 217 metres (712 ft) and covers an area of 33.74 km^{2} (13.03 sq mi) (2025).

== Population ==
Population statistic (10 years)
Year	1995	2005	2015	2025
Count	471	453	447	449
Difference		−3.82%	−1.32%	+0.44%

Population statistic
Year	2024	2025
Count	456	449
Difference		−1.53%

It has a population of 449 people (31 December 2025).

=== Ethnicity ===
Census 2021 (1+ %)
Ethnicity	Number	Fraction
Slovak	383	92.96%
Not found out	27	6.55%
Rusyn	12	2.91%
Total	412	

In year 2021 was 412 people by ethnicity 383 as Slovak, 27 as Not found out, 12 as Rusyn, 2 as Greek, 1 as Czech, 1 as Moravian, 1 as Hungarian and 1 as Bulgarian.

Note on population: The difference values of population numbers in the table "Population statistic" and in the sections "Ethnicity" & "Religion" is caused by the use of various statistical methods.

=== Religion ===
Census 2021 (1+ %)
Religion	Number	Fraction
Roman Catholic Church	287	69.66%
None	34	8.25%
Evangelical Church	29	7.04%
Not found out	26	6.31%
Greek Catholic Church	25	6.07%
Jehovah's Witnesses	7	1.7%
Total	412	

In year 2021 was 412 people by religion 287 from Roman Catholic Church, 34 from None, 29 from Evangelical Church, 26 from Not found out, 25 from Greek Catholic Church, 7 from Jehovah's Witnesses, 3 from Eastern Orthodox Church and 1 from Calvinist Church.
