= Vranov nad Topľou District =

Coordinates: 48°53′25″N 21°40′59″E

- District
- Country: Slovakia
- Region (kraj): Prešov Region
- Seat: Vranov nad Topľou

Area
  - Total: 769.23 km^{2} (297.00 sq mi)

Population (2025)
  - Total: 79,320
- Time zone: UTC+1 (CET)
  - Summer (DST): UTC+2 (CEST)
- Telephone prefix: 57
- Vehicle registration plate (until 2022): VT
- Municipalities: 68

Vranov nad Topľou District (Slovak: okres Vranov nad Topľou) is a district in the Prešov Region of eastern Slovakia. Until 1918, the district was mostly part of the county of Kingdom of Hungary of Zemplén, apart from an area around Hanušovce nad Topľou which formed part of the county of Sáros.

== Population ==
Population statistic (10 years)
Year	1995	2005	2015	2025
Count	73,914	77,931	80,464	79,320
Difference		+5.43%	+3.25%	−1.42%

Population statistic
Year	2024	2025
Count	79,395	79,320
Difference		−0.09%

It has a population of 79,320 people (31 December 2025).

Historical population
Year	Pop.	±%
1970	58,500	—
1980	65,600	+12.1%
1991	71,022	+8.3%
2001	76,504	+7.7%
2011	79,702	+4.2%
2021	79,426	−0.3%
Source: Statistical Office of the Slovak Republic

=== Ethnicity ===
Census 2021 (1+ %)
Ethnicity	Number	Fraction
Slovak	72,676	82.31%
Romani	10,103	11.44%
Not found out	3845	4.35%
Total	88,289	

In year 2021 was 88,289 people by ethnicity 72,676 as Slovak, 10,103 as Romani, 3845 as Not found out, 668 as Rusyn, 347 as Czech, 144 as Other, 102 as Ukrainian, 93 as Hungarian, 64 as Russian, 51 as Polish, 33 as English, 25 as German, 22 as Vietnamese, 17 as Canadian, 15 as Albanian, 13 as Italian, 13 as Romanian, 10 as Austrian, 8 as Bulgarian, 7 as Greek, 6 as Croatian, 5 as Irish, 5 as Serbian, 5 as Moravian, 5 as French, 4 as Jewish, 2 as Silesian and 1 as Turkish.

Note on population: The difference values of population numbers in the table "Population statistic" and in the sections "Ethnicity" & "Religion" is caused by the use of various statistical methods.

=== Religion ===
Census 2021 (1+ %)
Religion	Number	Fraction
Roman Catholic Church	39,937	50.28%
Greek Catholic Church	18,794	23.66%
Evangelical Church	8192	10.31%
None	6674	8.4%
Not found out	3696	4.65%
Total	79,426	

In year 2021 was 79,426 people by religion 39,937 from Roman Catholic Church, 18,794 from Greek Catholic Church, 8192 from Evangelical Church, 6674 from None, 3696 from Not found out, 666 from Jehovah's Witnesses, 361 from Apostolic Church, 278 from Eastern Orthodox Church, 158 from Church of the Brethren, 150 from Other and not ascertained christian church, 115 from Ad hoc movements, 112 from Christian Congregations in Slovakia, 88 from Calvinist Church, 70 from Other, 25 from United Methodist Church, 24 from Seventh-day Adventist Church, 20 from Islam, 17 from Paganism and natural spirituality, 16 from Buddhism, 12 from Baptists Church, 5 from Jewish community, 4 from Old Catholic Church, 4 from Czechoslovak Hussite Church, 3 from Hinduism, 2 from New Apostolic Church, 2 from Bahá'i Community and 1 from Church of Jesus Christ of Latter-day Saints.

== Municipalities ==
Municipality	Area [km^{2}]	Population
Babie	7.99	241
Banské	29.86	2,053
Benkovce	8.23	569
Bystré	13.21	2,755
Cabov	15.69	343
Čaklov	12.75	2,790
Čičava	5.27	1,395
Čierne nad Topľou	8.33	729
Ďapalovce	14.38	400
Davidov	16.78	774
Detrík	9.52	46
Dlhé Klčovo	10.21	1,342
Ďurďoš	6.13	288
Giglovce	4.02	131
Girovce	2.73	51
Hanušovce nad Topľou	14.25	3,719
Hencovce	6.82	1,343
Hermanovce nad Topľou	25.93	664
Hlinné	14.58	1,929
Holčíkovce	12.54	417
Jasenovce	5.65	219
Jastrabie nad Topľou	6.77	492
Juskova Voľa	18.14	279
Kamenná Poruba	7.41	1,763
Kladzany	5.35	536
Komárany	4.75	501
Kučín	3.97	523
Kvakovce	33.74	449
Majerovce	3.54	433
Malá Domaša	5.67	718
Matiaška	12.30	288
Medzianky	4.92	305
Merník	11.58	581
Michalok	12.31	285
Nižný Hrabovec	10.79	1,547
Nižný Hrušov	18.47	1,489
Nižný Kručov	3.70	379
Nová Kelča	11.83	364
Ondavské Matiašovce	10.29	818
Pavlovce	17.57	844
Petkovce	4.35	133
Petrovce	13.70	438
Piskorovce	7.67	110
Poša	8.43	1,022
Prosačov	4.30	239
Radvanovce	4.80	213
Rafajovce	4.74	151
Remeniny	10.59	288
Rudlov	16.04	737
Ruská Voľa	6.18	90
Sačurov	21.17	2,659
Sečovská Polianka	22.09	2,594
Sedliská	10.13	1,554
Skrabské	11.03	779
Slovenská Kajňa	6.72	689
Soľ	10.28	2,698
Štefanovce	8.92	89
Tovarné	7.70	964
Tovarnianska Polianka	4.23	101
Vavrinec	5.44	55
Vechec	17.27	3,055
Vlača	4.25	208
Vranov nad Topľou	34.35	20,007
Vyšný Kazimír	7.55	197
Vyšný Žipov	9.32	1,161
Zámutov	41.26	3,420
Zlatník	6.28	69
Žalobín	11.87	808

Population and area values are current for year 2025.
