= Medzianky =

- Municipality
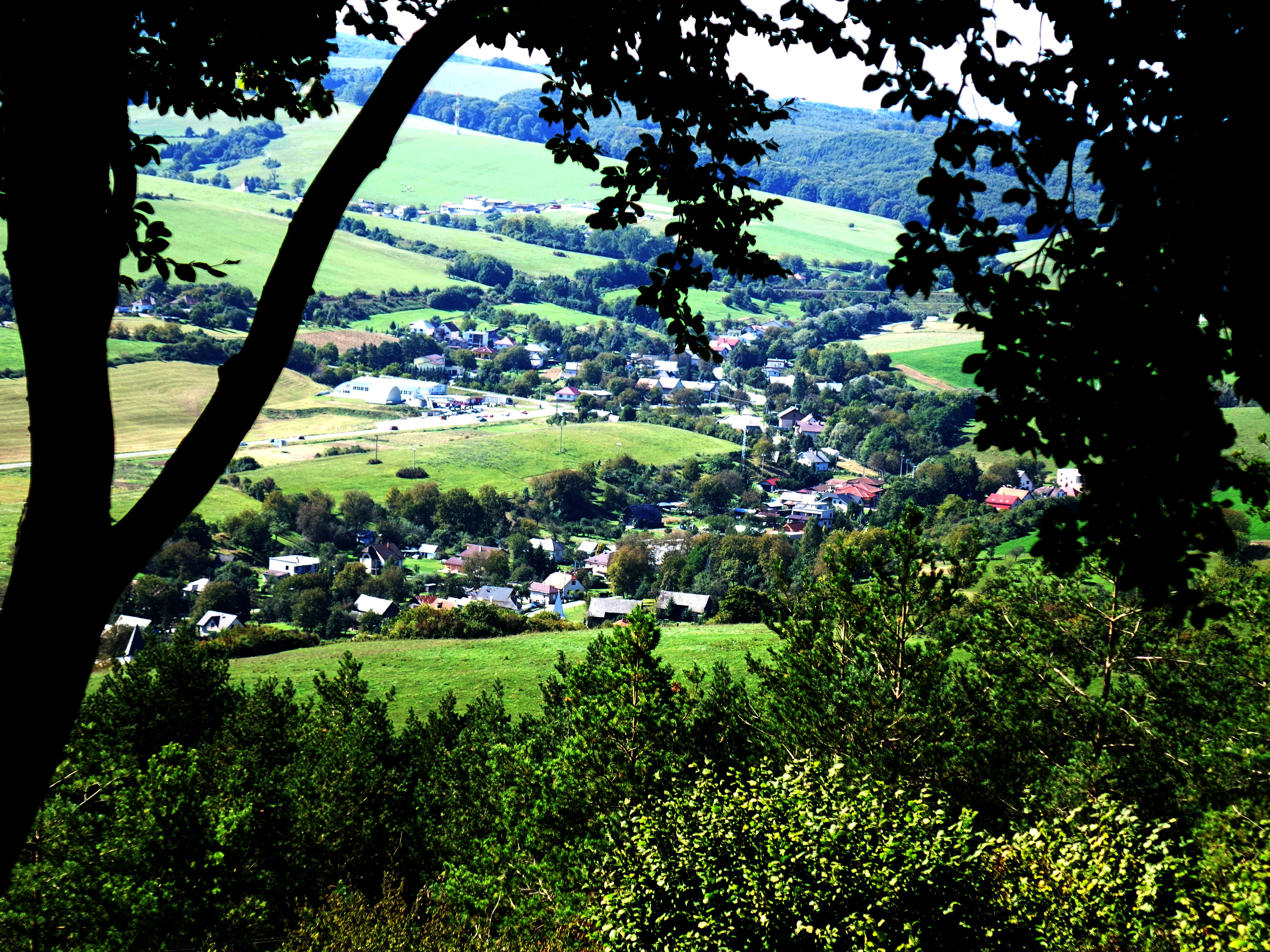

- Flag

- Location of Medzianky in the Prešov Region Location of Medzianky in Slovakia
- Coordinates: 49.03°N 21.47°E
- Country: Slovakia
- Region: Prešov Region
- District: Vranov nad Topľou District
- First mentioned: 1212

Area
  - Total: 4.92 km^{2} (1.90 sq mi)
- Elevation: 224 m (735 ft)

Population (2025)
  - Total: 305
- Time zone: UTC+1 (CET)
  - Summer (DST): UTC+2 (CEST)
- Postal code: 943 1
- Area code: +421 57
- Vehicle registration plate (until 2022): VT
- Website: medzianky.sk

Medzianky (Hungarian: Tapolymeggyes) is a village and municipality in Vranov nad Topľou District in the Prešov Region of eastern Slovakia.

== History ==
In historical records the village was first mentioned in 1212.

== Geography ==
The municipality lies at an altitude of 224 metres (735 ft) and covers an area of 4.92 km^{2} (1.90 sq mi) (2025).

== Population ==
Population statistic (10 years)
Year	1995	2005	2015	2025
Count	300	321	292	305
Difference		+7%	−9.03%	+4.45%

Population statistic
Year	2024	2025
Count	310	305
Difference		−1.61%

It has a population of 305 people (31 December 2025).

=== Ethnicity ===
Census 2021 (1+ %)
Ethnicity	Number	Fraction
Slovak	289	96.65%
Not found out	6	2%
Czech	4	1.33%
Total	299	

In year 2021 was 299 people by ethnicity 289 as Slovak, 6 as Not found out, 4 as Czech, 1 as Rusyn and 1 as Other.

Note on population: The difference values of population numbers in the table "Population statistic" and in the sections "Ethnicity" & "Religion" is caused by the use of various statistical methods.

=== Religion ===
Census 2021 (1+ %)
Religion	Number	Fraction
Evangelical Church	136	45.48%
Roman Catholic Church	129	43.14%
Church of the Brethren	12	4.01%
Greek Catholic Church	8	2.68%
Not found out	7	2.34%
None	3	1%
Ad hoc movements	3	1%
Total	299	

In year 2021 was 299 people by religion 136 from Evangelical Church, 129 from Roman Catholic Church, 12 from Church of the Brethren, 8 from Greek Catholic Church, 7 from Not found out, 3 from None, 3 from Ad hoc movements and 1 from Paganism and natural spirituality.
