= Prosačov =

- Municipality
- Flag

- Location of Prosačov in the Prešov Region Location of Prosačov in Slovakia
- Coordinates: 49.05°N 21.53°E
- Country: Slovakia
- Region: Prešov Region
- District: Vranov nad Topľou District
- First mentioned: 1363

Area
  - Total: 4.30 km^{2} (1.66 sq mi)
- Elevation: 200 m (660 ft)

Population (2025)
  - Total: 239
- Time zone: UTC+1 (CET)
  - Summer (DST): UTC+2 (CEST)
- Postal code: 943 1
- Area code: +421 57
- Vehicle registration plate (until 2022): VT
- Website: obec-prosacov.webnode.sk

Prosačov (Hungarian: Porszács) is a village and municipality in Vranov nad Topľou District in the Prešov Region of eastern Slovakia.

== Geography ==
The municipality lies at an altitude of 200 metres (660 ft) and covers an area of 4.30 km^{2} (1.66 sq mi) (2025).

== Population ==
Population statistic (10 years)
Year	1995	2005	2015	2025
Count	154	208	231	239
Difference		+35.06%	+11.05%	+3.46%

Population statistic
Year	2024	2025
Count	228	239
Difference		+4.82%

It has a population of 239 people (31 December 2025).

=== Ethnicity ===
Census 2021 (1+ %)
Ethnicity	Number	Fraction
Slovak	197	93.36%
Romani	27	12.79%
Not found out	6	2.84%
Czech	4	1.89%
Total	211	

In year 2021 was 211 people by ethnicity 197 as Slovak, 27 as Romani, 6 as Not found out and 4 as Czech.

Note on population: The difference values of population numbers in the table "Population statistic" and in the sections "Ethnicity" & "Religion" is caused by the use of various statistical methods.

The vast majority of the municipality's population consists of the local Roma community. In 2019, they constituted an estimated 70% of the local population.

=== Religion ===
Census 2021 (1+ %)
Religion	Number	Fraction
Greek Catholic Church	100	47.39%
None	74	35.07%
Roman Catholic Church	20	9.48%
Jehovah's Witnesses	12	5.69%
Not found out	5	2.37%
Total	211	

In year 2021 was 211 people by religion 100 from Greek Catholic Church, 74 from None, 20 from Roman Catholic Church, 12 from Jehovah's Witnesses and 5 from Not found out.
