= Matiaška =

- Municipality
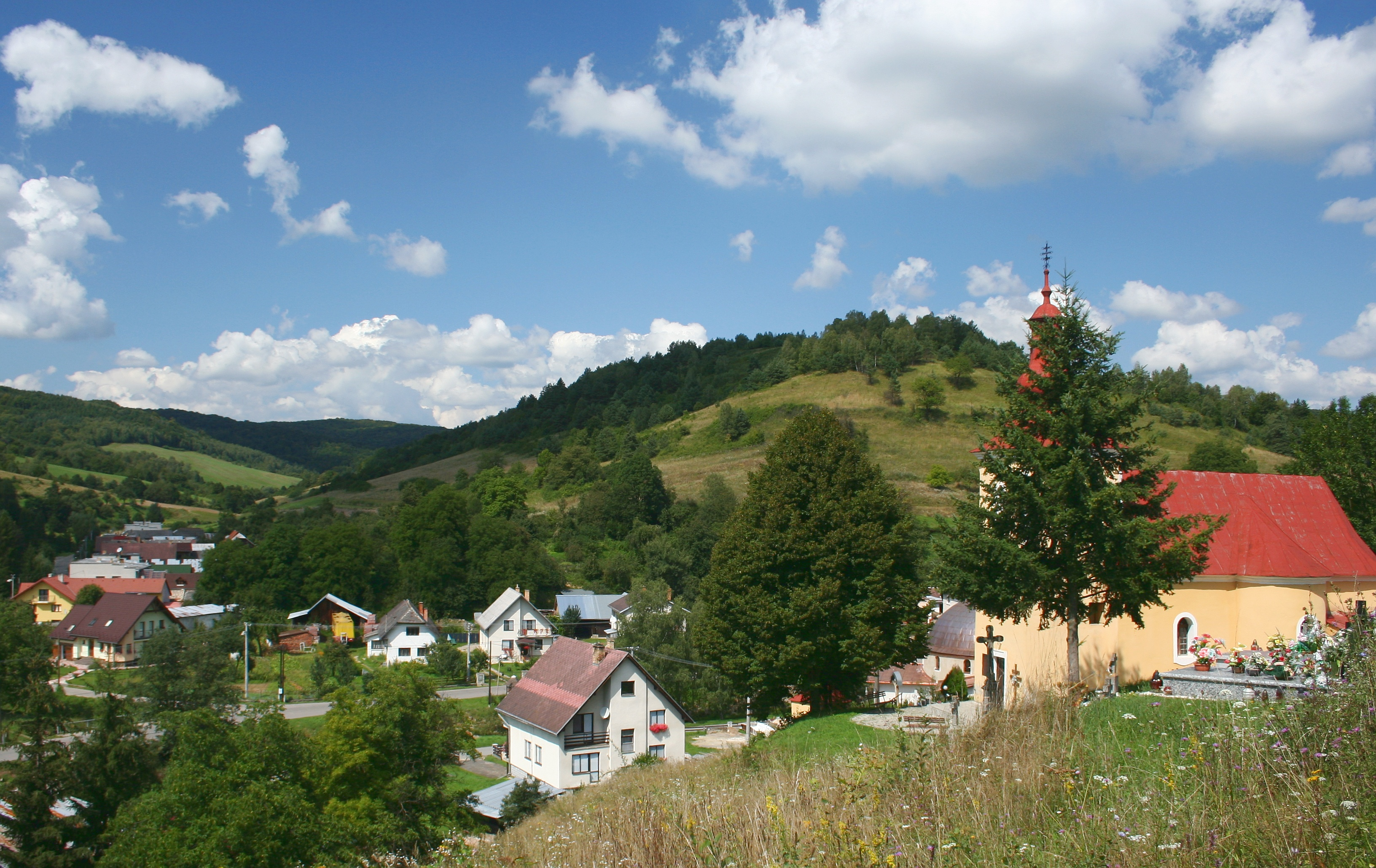

- Flag

- Location of Matiaška in the Prešov Region Location of Matiaška in Slovakia
- Coordinates: 49.07°N 21.58°E
- Country: Slovakia
- Region: Prešov Region
- District: Vranov nad Topľou District
- First mentioned: 1363

Area
  - Total: 12.30 km^{2} (4.75 sq mi)
- Elevation: 217 m (712 ft)

Population (2025)
  - Total: 288
- Time zone: UTC+1 (CET)
  - Summer (DST): UTC+2 (CEST)
- Postal code: 943 1
- Area code: +421 57
- Vehicle registration plate (until 2022): VT
- Website: www.obecmatiaska.sk

Matiaška (Hungarian: Mátyáska) is a village and municipality in Vranov nad Topľou District in the Prešov Region of eastern Slovakia.

== History ==
In historical records the village was first mentioned in 1363.

== Geography ==
The municipality lies at an altitude of 217 metres (712 ft) and covers an area of 12.30 km^{2} (4.75 sq mi) (2025).

== Population ==
Population statistic (10 years)
Year	1995	2005	2015	2025
Count	271	278	286	288
Difference		+2.58%	+2.87%	+0.69%

Population statistic
Year	2024	2025
Count	291	288
Difference		−1.03%

It has a population of 288 people (31 December 2025).

=== Ethnicity ===
Census 2021 (1+ %)
Ethnicity	Number	Fraction
Slovak	287	98.96%
Rusyn	17	5.86%
Total	290	

In year 2021 was 290 people by ethnicity 287 as Slovak, 17 as Rusyn, 2 as Polish and 1 as Not found out.

Note on population: The difference values of population numbers in the table "Population statistic" and in the sections "Ethnicity" & "Religion" is caused by the use of various statistical methods.

=== Religion ===
Census 2021 (1+ %)
Religion	Number	Fraction
Greek Catholic Church	238	82.07%
Roman Catholic Church	37	12.76%
Evangelical Church	7	2.41%
None	5	1.72%
Eastern Orthodox Church	3	1.03%
Total	290	

In year 2021 was 290 people by religion 238 from Greek Catholic Church, 37 from Roman Catholic Church, 7 from Evangelical Church, 5 from None and 3 from Eastern Orthodox Church.
