= Hencovce =

- Municipality
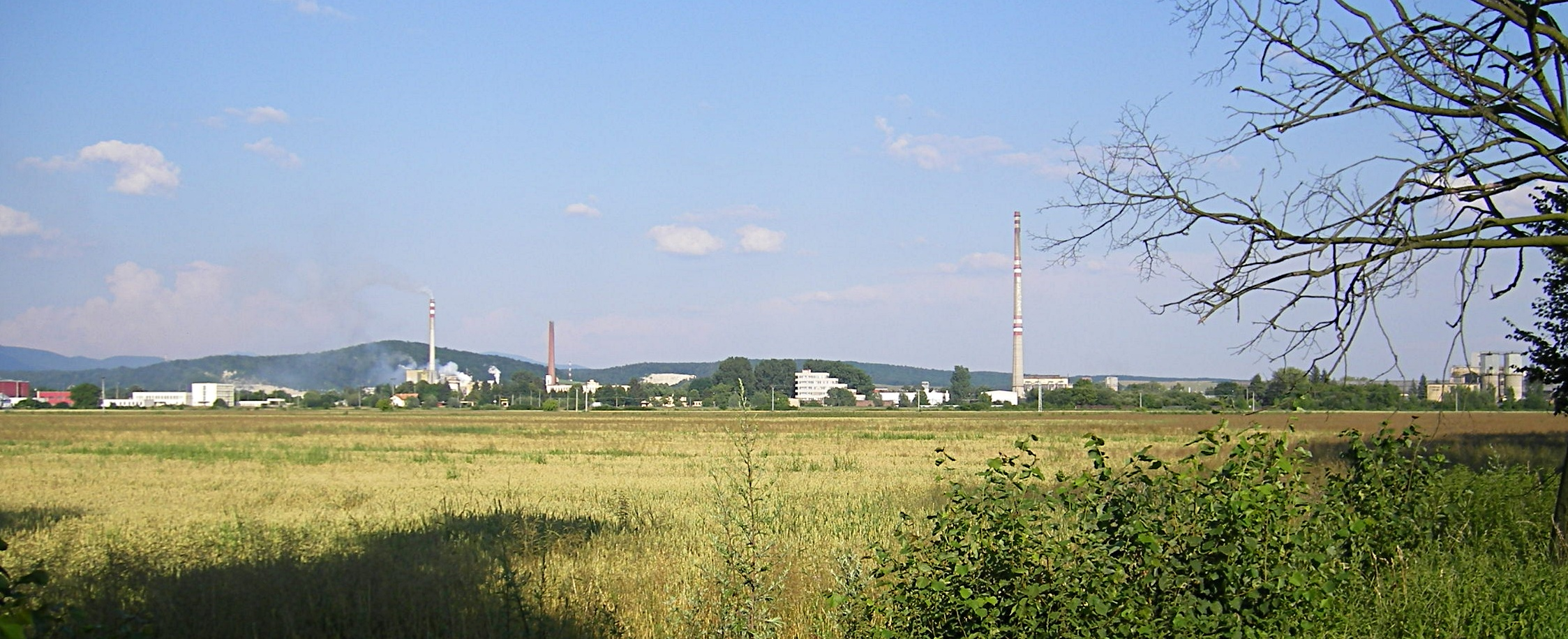

- Flag

- Location of Hencovce in the Prešov Region Location of Hencovce in Slovakia
- Coordinates: 48.88°N 21.73°E
- Country: Slovakia
- Region: Prešov Region
- District: Vranov nad Topľou District
- First mentioned: 1372

Area
  - Total: 6.82 km^{2} (2.63 sq mi)
- Elevation: 122 m (400 ft)

Population (2025)
  - Total: 1,343
- Time zone: UTC+1 (CET)
  - Summer (DST): UTC+2 (CEST)
- Postal code: 930 2
- Area code: +421 57
- Vehicle registration plate (until 2022): VT
- Website: www.hencovce.sk

Hencovce (Hungarian: Hencfalva, until 1899: Henczócz) is a village and municipality in Vranov nad Topľou District in the Prešov Region of eastern Slovakia.

== History ==
In historical records the village was first mentioned in 1372.

== Geography ==
The municipality lies at an altitude of 122 metres (400 ft) and covers an area of 6.82 km^{2} (2.63 sq mi) (2025).

== Population ==
Population statistic (10 years)
Year	1995	2005	2015	2025
Count	0	1257	1342	1343
Difference		–	+6.76%	+0.07%

Population statistic
Year	2024	2025
Count	1340	1343
Difference		+0.22%

It has a population of 1343 people (31 December 2025).

=== Ethnicity ===
Census 2021 (1+ %)
Ethnicity	Number	Fraction
Slovak	1241	94.66%
Not found out	56	4.27%
Romani	38	2.89%
Total	1311	

In year 2021 was 1311 people by ethnicity 1241 as Slovak, 56 as Not found out, 38 as Romani, 10 as Rusyn, 6 as Hungarian, 1 as Czech, 1 as Russian, 1 as Moravian and 1 as English.

Note on population: The difference values of population numbers in the table "Population statistic" and in the sections "Ethnicity" & "Religion" is caused by the use of various statistical methods.

=== Religion ===
Census 2021 (1+ %)
Religion	Number	Fraction
Roman Catholic Church	954	72.77%
Evangelical Church	116	8.85%
Greek Catholic Church	83	6.33%
None	81	6.18%
Not found out	56	4.27%
Total	1311	

In year 2021 was 1311 people by religion 954 from Roman Catholic Church, 116 from Evangelical Church, 83 from Greek Catholic Church, 81 from None, 56 from Not found out, 13 from Eastern Orthodox Church, 3 from Calvinist Church, 2 from United Methodist Church, 1 from Other and not ascertained christian church, 1 from Jehovah's Witnesses and 1 from Other.

== Genealogical resources ==
The records for genealogical research are available at the state archive "Statny Archiv in Presov, Slovakia"

- Roman Catholic church records (births/marriages/deaths): 1687-1895 (parish B)
- Greek Catholic church records (births/marriages/deaths): 1801-1899 (parish B)
- Lutheran church records (births/marriages/deaths): 1805-1925 (parish B)

== See also ==
- List of municipalities and towns in Slovakia
