= Merník =

- Municipality
- Flag

- Location of Merník in the Prešov Region Location of Merník in Slovakia
- Coordinates: 48.95°N 21.65°E
- Country: Slovakia
- Region: Prešov Region
- District: Vranov nad Topľou District
- First mentioned: 1363

Area
  - Total: 11.58 km^{2} (4.47 sq mi)
- Elevation: 176 m (577 ft)

Population (2025)
  - Total: 581
- Time zone: UTC+1 (CET)
  - Summer (DST): UTC+2 (CEST)
- Postal code: 942 3
- Area code: +421 57
- Vehicle registration plate (until 2022): VT
- Website: www.obecmernik.sk

Merník (Hungarian: Merészpatak, until 1899: Mernyik) is a village and municipality in Vranov nad Topľou District in the Prešov Region of eastern Slovakia.

== History ==
In historical records the village was first mentioned in 1363. A former mercury mine was situated near the village.

== Geography ==
The municipality lies at an altitude of 176 metres (577 ft) and covers an area of 11.58 km^{2} (4.47 sq mi) (2025).

== Population ==
Population statistic (10 years)
| Year | 1995 | 2005 | 2015 | 2025 |
|---|---|---|---|---|
| Count | 644 | 619 | 603 | 581 |
| Difference | | −3.88% | −2.58% | −3.64% |

Population statistic
| Year | 2024 | 2025 |
|---|---|---|
| Count | 584 | 581 |
| Difference | | −0.51% |

It has a population of 581 people (31 December 2025).

=== Ethnicity ===
Census 2021 (1+ %)
| Ethnicity | Number | Fraction |
|---|---|---|
| Slovak | 600 | 97.71% |
| Not found out | 13 | 2.11% |
| Total | 614 | |

In year 2021 was 614 people by ethnicity 600 as Slovak, 13 as Not found out, 2 as Czech, 2 as Other and 1 as Hungarian.

Note on population: The difference values of population numbers in the table "Population statistic" and in the sections "Ethnicity" & "Religion" is caused by the use of various statistical methods.

=== Religion ===
Census 2021 (1+ %)
| Religion | Number | Fraction |
|---|---|---|
| Evangelical Church | 326 | 53.09% |
| Roman Catholic Church | 173 | 28.18% |
| Greek Catholic Church | 83 | 13.52% |
| Not found out | 17 | 2.77% |
| None | 12 | 1.95% |
| Total | 614 | |

In year 2021 was 614 people by religion 326 from Evangelical Church, 173 from Roman Catholic Church, 83 from Greek Catholic Church, 17 from Not found out, 12 from None, 2 from Jehovah's Witnesses and 1 from Other and not ascertained christian church.
