= Petkovce =

- Municipality
- Flag

- Location of Petkovce in the Prešov Region Location of Petkovce in Slovakia
- Coordinates: 49.02°N 21.60°E
- Country: Slovakia
- Region: Prešov Region
- District: Vranov nad Topľou District
- First mentioned: 1363

Area
  - Total: 4.35 km^{2} (1.68 sq mi)
- Elevation: 209 m (686 ft)

Population (2025)
  - Total: 133
- Time zone: UTC+1 (CET)
  - Summer (DST): UTC+2 (CEST)
- Postal code: 943 3
- Area code: +421 57
- Vehicle registration plate (until 2022): VT
- Website: www.petkovce.sk

Petkovce (Hungarian: Petkes, until 1899: Petkócz) is a village and municipality in Vranov nad Topľou District in the Prešov Region of eastern Slovakia.

== History ==
In historical records the village was first mentioned in 1363.

== Geography ==
The municipality lies at an altitude of 209 metres (686 ft) and covers an area of 4.35 km^{2} (1.68 sq mi) (2025).

== Population ==
Population statistic (10 years)
Year	1995	2005	2015	2025
Count	144	147	148	133
Difference		+2.08%	+0.68%	−10.13%

Population statistic
Year	2024	2025
Count	133	133
Difference		+0%

It has a population of 133 people (31 December 2025).

=== Ethnicity ===
Census 2021 (1+ %)
Ethnicity	Number	Fraction
Slovak	134	99.25%
Total	135	

In year 2021 was 135 people by ethnicity 134 as Slovak, 1 as Rusyn, 1 as Russian and 1 as Not found out.

Note on population: The difference values of population numbers in the table "Population statistic" and in the sections "Ethnicity" & "Religion" is caused by the use of various statistical methods.

=== Religion ===
Census 2021 (1+ %)
Religion	Number	Fraction
Greek Catholic Church	92	68.15%
Roman Catholic Church	38	28.15%
Evangelical Church	2	1.48%
None	2	1.48%
Total	135	

In year 2021 was 135 people by religion 92 from Greek Catholic Church, 38 from Roman Catholic Church, 2 from Evangelical Church, 2 from None and 1 from Not found out.
