= Zámutov =

Village and municipality in Slovakia

- Municipality
- Flag

- Location of Zámutov in the Prešov Region Location of Zámutov in Slovakia
- Coordinates: 48.90°N 21.57°E
- Country: Slovakia
- Region: Prešov Region
- District: Vranov nad Topľou District
- First mentioned: 1402

Area
  - Total: 41.26 km^{2} (15.93 sq mi)
- Elevation: 272 m (892 ft)

Population (2025)
  - Total: 3,420
- Time zone: UTC+1 (CET)
  - Summer (DST): UTC+2 (CEST)
- Postal code: 941 5
- Area code: +421 57
- Vehicle registration plate (until 2022): VT
- Website: zamutov.sk

Zámutov (Hungarian: Opálhegy) is a village and municipality in Vranov nad Topľou District in the Prešov Region of eastern Slovakia.

== History ==
In historical records the village was first mentioned in 1402. Former names of the village (town): 1808, 1863–1902 Zamutó, 1907–1913 Opálhegy, 1920 – Zámutov

== Geography ==
The municipality lies at an altitude of 272 metres (892 ft) and covers an area of 41.26 km^{2} (15.93 sq mi) (2025).

== Population ==
Population statistic (10 years)
Year	1995	2005	2015	2025
Count	2453	2808	3154	3420
Difference		+14.47%	+12.32%	+8.43%

Population statistic
Year	2024	2025
Count	3405	3420
Difference		+0.44%

It has a population of 3420 people (31 December 2025).

=== Ethnicity ===
Census 2021 (1+ %)
Ethnicity	Number	Fraction
Slovak	2133	64.83%
Romani	1320	40.12%
Not found out	61	1.85%
Total	3290	

In year 2021 was 3290 people by ethnicity 2133 as Slovak, 1320 as Romani, 61 as Not found out, 8 as Rusyn, 5 as Czech, 3 as Other, 3 as English, 2 as Ukrainian, 2 as Romanian, 1 as Russian, 1 as Hungarian and 1 as Bulgarian.

Note on population: The difference values of population numbers in the table "Population statistic" and in the sections "Ethnicity" & "Religion" is caused by the use of various statistical methods.

=== Religion ===
Census 2021 (1+ %)
Religion	Number	Fraction
None	1081	32.86%
Greek Catholic Church	881	26.78%
Roman Catholic Church	789	23.98%
Jehovah's Witnesses	236	7.17%
Evangelical Church	174	5.29%
Other and not ascertained christian church	57	1.73%
Not found out	44	1.34%
Total	3290	

In year 2021 was 3290 people by religion 1081 from None, 881 from Greek Catholic Church, 789 from Roman Catholic Church, 236 from Jehovah's Witnesses, 174 from Evangelical Church, 57 from Other and not ascertained christian church, 44 from Not found out, 9 from Eastern Orthodox Church, 9 from Apostolic Church, 4 from Seventh-day Adventist Church, 2 from Calvinist Church, 1 from Christian Congregations in Slovakia, 1 from Czechoslovak Hussite Church, 1 from Buddhism and 1 from Ad hoc movements.
