= Zlatník =

- Municipality
- Flag

- Location of Zlatník in the Prešov Region Location of Zlatník in Slovakia
- Coordinates: 48.97°N 21.55°E
- Country: Slovakia
- Region: Prešov Region
- District: Vranov nad Topľou District
- First mentioned: 1478

Area
  - Total: 6.28 km^{2} (2.42 sq mi)
- Elevation: 245 m (804 ft)

Population (2025)
  - Total: 69
- Time zone: UTC+1 (CET)
  - Summer (DST): UTC+2 (CEST)
- Postal code: 943 3
- Area code: +421 57
- Vehicle registration plate (until 2022): VT
- Website: www.obeczlatnik.eu

Zlatník (Hungarian: Aranyospatak) is a village and municipality in Vranov nad Topľou District in the Prešov Region of eastern Slovakia.

== History ==
In historical records the village was first mentioned in 1478.

== Geography ==
The municipality lies at an altitude of 245 metres (804 ft) and covers an area of 6.28 km^{2} (2.42 sq mi) (2025).

== Population ==
Population statistic (10 years)
| Year | 1995 | 2005 | 2015 | 2025 |
|---|---|---|---|---|
| Count | 87 | 76 | 77 | 69 |
| Difference | | −12.64% | +1.31% | −10.38% |

Population statistic
| Year | 2024 | 2025 |
|---|---|---|
| Count | 70 | 69 |
| Difference | | −1.42% |

It has a population of 69 people (31 December 2025).

=== Ethnicity ===
Census 2021 (1+ %)
| Ethnicity | Number | Fraction |
|---|---|---|
| Slovak | 76 | 100% |
| Total | 76 | |

In year 2021 was 76 people by ethnicity 76 as Slovak.

Note on population: The difference values of population numbers in the table "Population statistic" and in the sections "Ethnicity" & "Religion" is caused by the use of various statistical methods.

=== Religion ===
Census 2021 (1+ %)
| Religion | Number | Fraction |
|---|---|---|
| Evangelical Church | 27 | 35.53% |
| Roman Catholic Church | 26 | 34.21% |
| Greek Catholic Church | 15 | 19.74% |
| None | 7 | 9.21% |
| Church of the Brethren | 1 | 1.32% |
| Total | 76 | |

In year 2021 was 76 people by religion 27 from Evangelical Church, 26 from Roman Catholic Church, 15 from Greek Catholic Church, 7 from None and 1 from Church of the Brethren.
