= Tovarnianska Polianka =

- Municipality
- Flag Coat of arms

- Location of Tovarnianska Polianka in the Prešov Region Location of Tovarnianska Polianka in Slovakia
- Coordinates: 48.90°N 21.78°E
- Country: Slovakia
- Region: Prešov Region
- District: Vranov nad Topľou District
- First mentioned: 1335

Area
  - Total: 4.23 km^{2} (1.63 sq mi)
- Elevation: 137 m (449 ft)

Population (2025)
  - Total: 101
- Time zone: UTC+1 (CET)
  - Summer (DST): UTC+2 (CEST)
- Postal code: 940 1
- Area code: +421 57
- Vehicle registration plate (until 2022): VT
- Website: www.tovarnianskapolianka.sk

Tovarnianska Polianka (Hungarian: Tavarnamező, until 1899: Tavarna-Polyánka) is a village and municipality in Vranov nad Topľou District in the Prešov Region of eastern Slovakia.

== History ==
In historical records the village was first mentioned in 1335.

== Geography ==
The municipality lies at an altitude of 137 metres (449 ft) and covers an area of 4.23 km^{2} (1.63 sq mi) (2025).

== Population ==
Population statistic (10 years)
Year	1995	2005	2015	2025
Count	132	125	115	101
Difference		−5.30%	−8%	−12.17%

Population statistic
Year	2024	2025
Count	102	101
Difference		−0.98%

It has a population of 101 people (31 December 2025).

=== Ethnicity ===
Census 2021 (1+ %)
Ethnicity	Number	Fraction
Slovak	108	98.18%
Not found out	2	1.81%
Total	110	

In year 2021 was 110 people by ethnicity 108 as Slovak, 2 as Not found out and 1 as Rusyn.

Note on population: The difference values of population numbers in the table "Population statistic" and in the sections "Ethnicity" & "Religion" is caused by the use of various statistical methods.

=== Religion ===
Census 2021 (1+ %)
Religion	Number	Fraction
Roman Catholic Church	58	52.73%
Greek Catholic Church	40	36.36%
Evangelical Church	10	9.09%
Not found out	2	1.82%
Total	110	

In year 2021 was 110 people by religion 58 from Roman Catholic Church, 40 from Greek Catholic Church, 10 from Evangelical Church and 2 from Not found out.
