= Cabov =

- Municipality
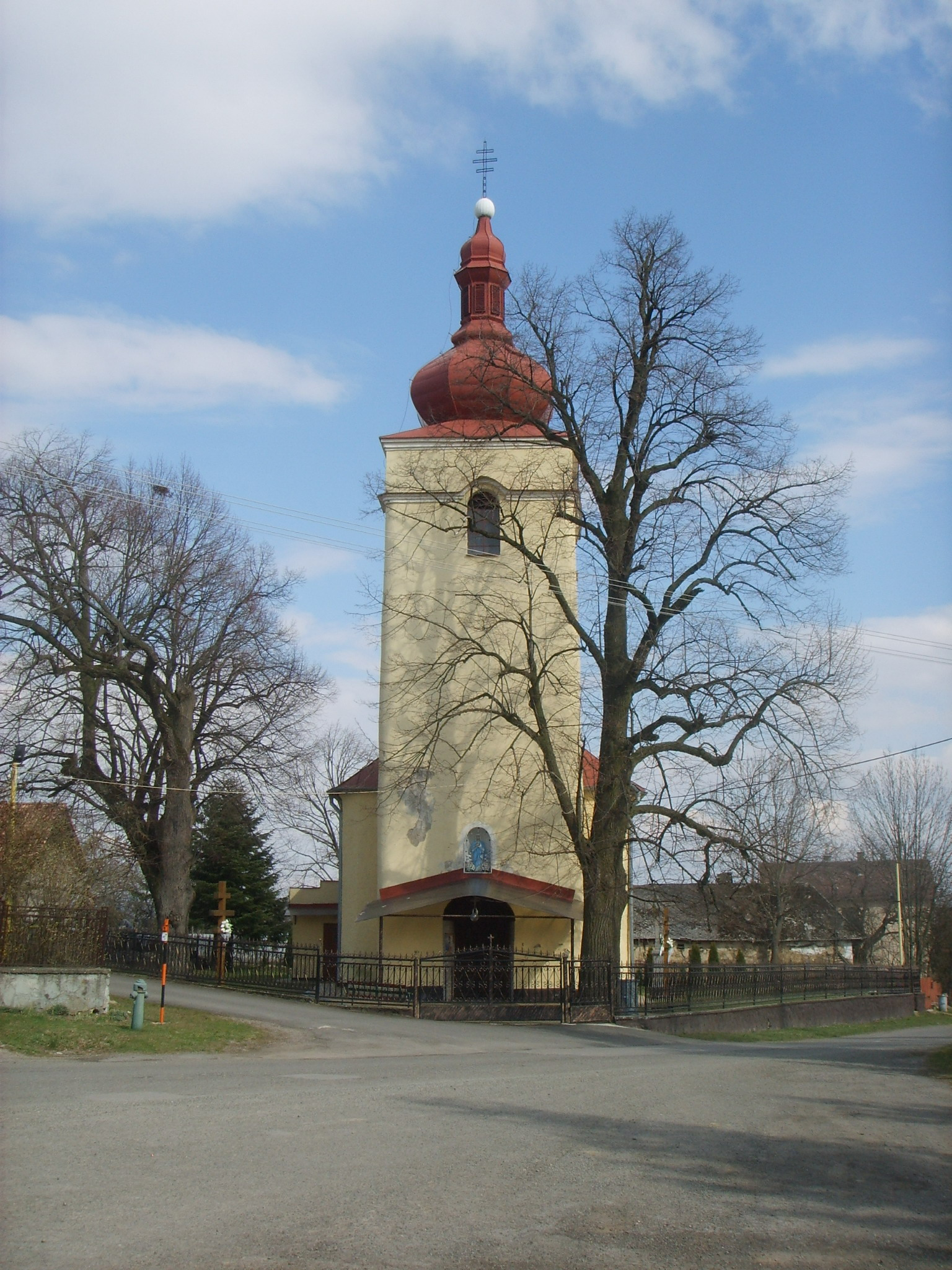

- Flag

- Location of Cabov in the Prešov Region Location of Cabov in Slovakia
- Coordinates: 49.02°N 21.55°E
- Country: Slovakia
- Region: Prešov Region
- District: Vranov nad Topľou District
- First mentioned: 1410

Area
  - Total: 15.69 km^{2} (6.06 sq mi)
- Elevation: 217 m (712 ft)

Population (2025)
  - Total: 343
- Time zone: UTC+1 (CET)
  - Summer (DST): UTC+2 (CEST)
- Postal code: 941 4
- Area code: +421 57
- Vehicle registration plate (until 2022): VT
- Website: www.cabov.sk

Cabov (Hungarian: Csábóc) is a village and municipality in Vranov nad Topľou District in the Prešov Region of eastern Slovakia.

== History ==
In historical records the village was first mentioned in 1410.

== Geography ==
The municipality lies at an altitude of 217 metres (712 ft) and covers an area of 15.69 km^{2} (6.06 sq mi) (2025).

== Population ==
Population statistic (10 years)
Year	1995	2005	2015	2025
Count	411	427	401	343
Difference		+3.89%	−6.08%	−14.46%

Population statistic
Year	2024	2025
Count	350	343
Difference		−2%

It has a population of 343 people (31 December 2025).

According to the 2011 census, the municipality had 410 inhabitants. 401 of inhabitants were Slovaks and 9 others and unspecified.

=== Ethnicity ===
Census 2021 (1+ %)
Ethnicity	Number	Fraction
Slovak	379	98.95%
Rusyn	4	1.04%
Not found out	4	1.04%
Total	383	

In year 2021 was 383 people by ethnicity 379 as Slovak, 4 as Rusyn, 4 as Not found out and 3 as Italian.

Note on population: The difference values of population numbers in the table "Population statistic" and in the sections "Ethnicity" & "Religion" is caused by the use of various statistical methods.

=== Religion ===
Census 2021 (1+ %)
Religion	Number	Fraction
Greek Catholic Church	234	61.1%
Roman Catholic Church	110	28.72%
None	31	8.09%
Total	383	

In year 2021 was 383 people by religion 234 from Greek Catholic Church, 110 from Roman Catholic Church, 31 from None, 2 from Evangelical Church, 2 from Ad hoc movements, 1 from Calvinist Church, 1 from Eastern Orthodox Church, 1 from Not found out and 1 from Christian Congregations in Slovakia.

== See also ==
- List of municipalities and towns in Slovakia

== Genealogical resources ==
The records for genealogical research are available at the state archive "Statny Archiv in Presov, Slovakia"

- Roman Catholic church records (births/marriages/deaths): 1770-1895 (parish B)
- Greek Catholic church records (births/marriages/deaths): 1882-1895 (parish A)
