= Giglovce =

- Municipality
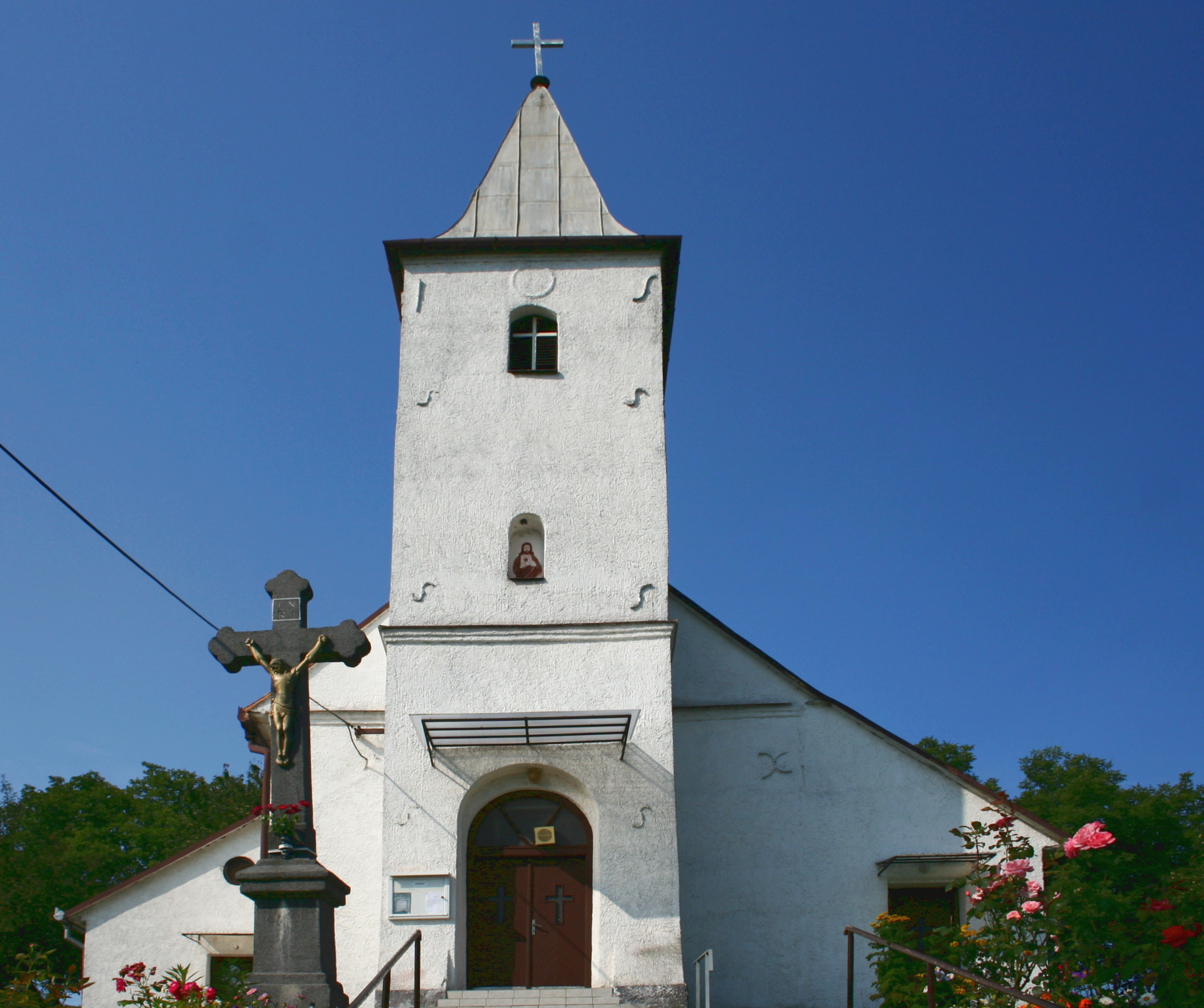

- Flag

- Location of Giglovce in the Prešov Region Location of Giglovce in Slovakia
- Coordinates: 49.00°N 21.73°E
- Country: Slovakia
- Region: Prešov Region
- District: Vranov nad Topľou District
- First mentioned: 1408

Area
  - Total: 4.02 km^{2} (1.55 sq mi)
- Elevation: 149 m (489 ft)

Population (2025)
  - Total: 131
- Time zone: UTC+1 (CET)
  - Summer (DST): UTC+2 (CEST)
- Postal code: 940 5
- Area code: +421 57
- Vehicle registration plate (until 2022): VT

Giglovce (Hungarian: Giglóc) is a village and municipality in Vranov nad Topľou District in the Prešov Region of eastern Slovakia.

== History ==
In historical records the village was first mentioned in 1408.

== Geography ==
The municipality lies at an altitude of 149 metres (489 ft) and covers an area of 4.02 km^{2} (1.55 sq mi) (2025).

== Population ==
Population statistic (10 years)
Year	1995	2005	2015	2025
Count	191	168	137	131
Difference		−12.04%	−18.45%	−4.37%

Population statistic
Year	2024	2025
Count	130	131
Difference		+0.76%

It has a population of 131 people (31 December 2025).

=== Ethnicity ===
Census 2021 (1+ %)
Ethnicity	Number	Fraction
Slovak	146	100%
Total	146	

In year 2021 was 146 people by ethnicity 146 as Slovak and 1 as Not found out.

Note on population: The difference values of population numbers in the table "Population statistic" and in the sections "Ethnicity" & "Religion" is caused by the use of various statistical methods.

=== Religion ===
Census 2021 (1+ %)
Religion	Number	Fraction
Roman Catholic Church	141	96.58%
Greek Catholic Church	4	2.74%
Total	146	

In year 2021 was 146 people by religion 141 from Roman Catholic Church, 4 from Greek Catholic Church and 1 from Evangelical Church.

== See also ==
- List of municipalities and towns in Slovakia

== Genealogical resources ==
The records for genealogical research are available at the state archive "Statny Archiv in Presov, Slovakia"

- Roman Catholic church records (births/marriages/deaths): 1788-1895 (parish B)
- Greek Catholic church records (births/marriages/deaths): 1802-1895 (parish B)
