= Komárany =

- Municipality
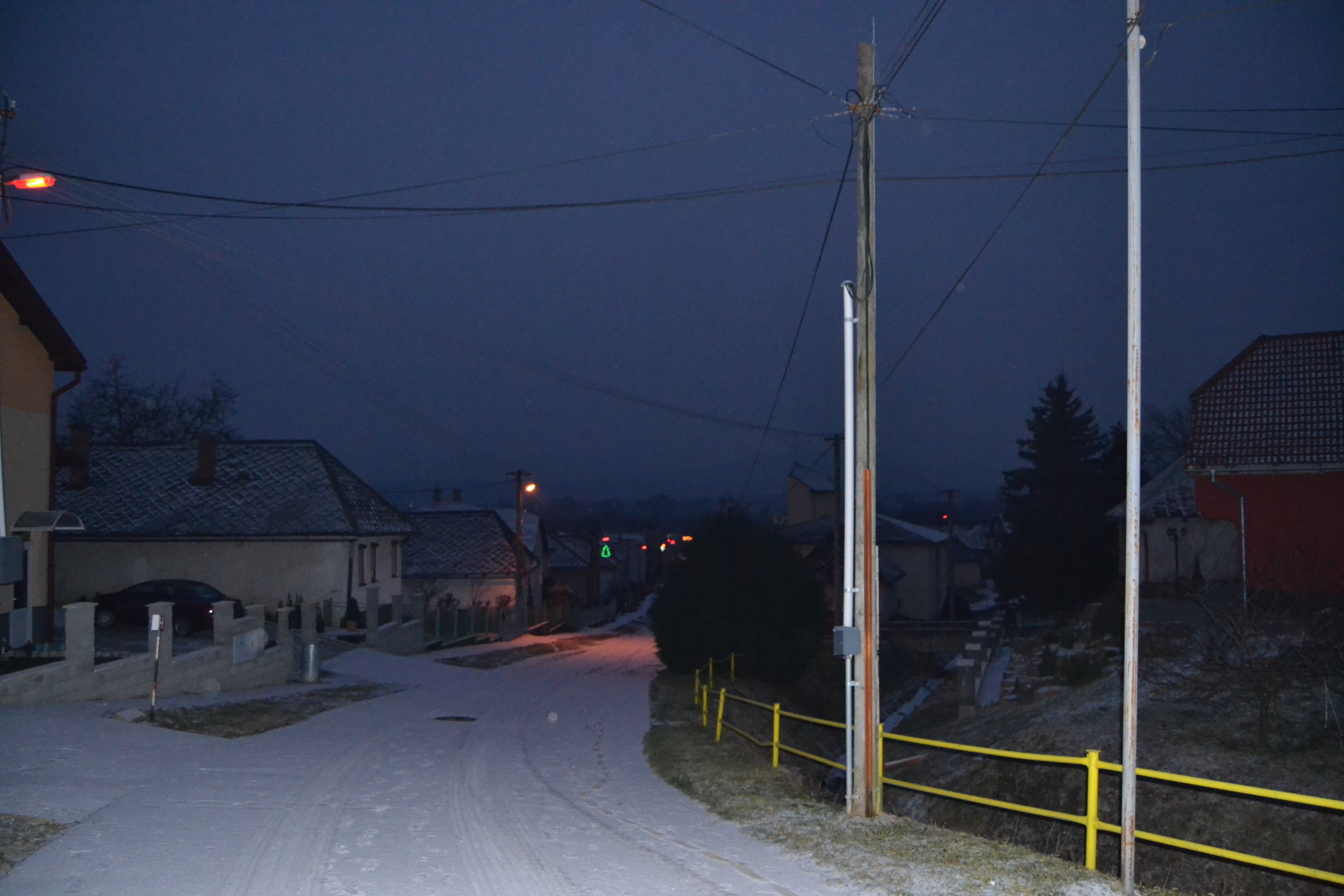

- Flag

- Location of Komárany in the Prešov Region Location of Komárany in Slovakia
- Coordinates: 48.93°N 21.65°E
- Country: Slovakia
- Region: Prešov Region
- District: Vranov nad Topľou District
- First mentioned: 1303

Area
  - Total: 4.75 km^{2} (1.83 sq mi)
- Elevation: 135 m (443 ft)

Population (2025)
  - Total: 501
- Time zone: UTC+1 (CET)
  - Summer (DST): UTC+2 (CEST)
- Postal code: 930 1
- Area code: +421 57
- Vehicle registration plate (until 2022): VT
- Website: komarany.sk

Komárany (Hungarian: Alsókomaróc) is a village and municipality in Vranov nad Topľou District in the Prešov Region of eastern Slovakia.

== History ==
In historical records the village was first mentioned in 1303.

== Geography ==
The municipality lies at an altitude of 135 metres (443 ft) and covers an area of 4.75 km^{2} (1.83 sq mi) (2025).

== Population ==
Population statistic (10 years)
Year	1995	2005	2015	2025
Count	492	501	484	501
Difference		+1.82%	−3.39%	+3.51%

Population statistic
Year	2024	2025
Count	510	501
Difference		−1.76%

It has a population of 501 people (31 December 2025).

=== Ethnicity ===
Census 2021 (1+ %)
Ethnicity	Number	Fraction
Slovak	499	98.81%
Total	505	

In year 2021 was 505 people by ethnicity 499 as Slovak, 4 as Romani, 3 as Polish, 3 as Not found out, 3 as Other, 3 as Croatian and 1 as Russian.

Note on population: The difference values of population numbers in the table "Population statistic" and in the sections "Ethnicity" & "Religion" is caused by the use of various statistical methods.

=== Religion ===
Census 2021 (1+ %)
Religion	Number	Fraction
Roman Catholic Church	277	54.85%
Evangelical Church	106	20.99%
Greek Catholic Church	101	20%
None	13	2.57%
Total	505	

In year 2021 was 505 people by religion 277 from Roman Catholic Church, 106 from Evangelical Church, 101 from Greek Catholic Church, 13 from None, 3 from Calvinist Church, 3 from Eastern Orthodox Church, 1 from Not found out and 1 from United Methodist Church.

== Genealogical resources ==
The records for genealogical research are available at the state archive "Statny Archiv in Presov, Slovakia"

- Roman Catholic church records (births/marriages/deaths): 1769-1910 (parish B)
- Greek Catholic church records (births/marriages/deaths): 1787-1901 (parish B)
- Lutheran church records (births/marriages/deaths): 1830-1902 (parish B)

== See also ==
- List of municipalities and towns in Slovakia
