= Radvanovce =

- Municipality
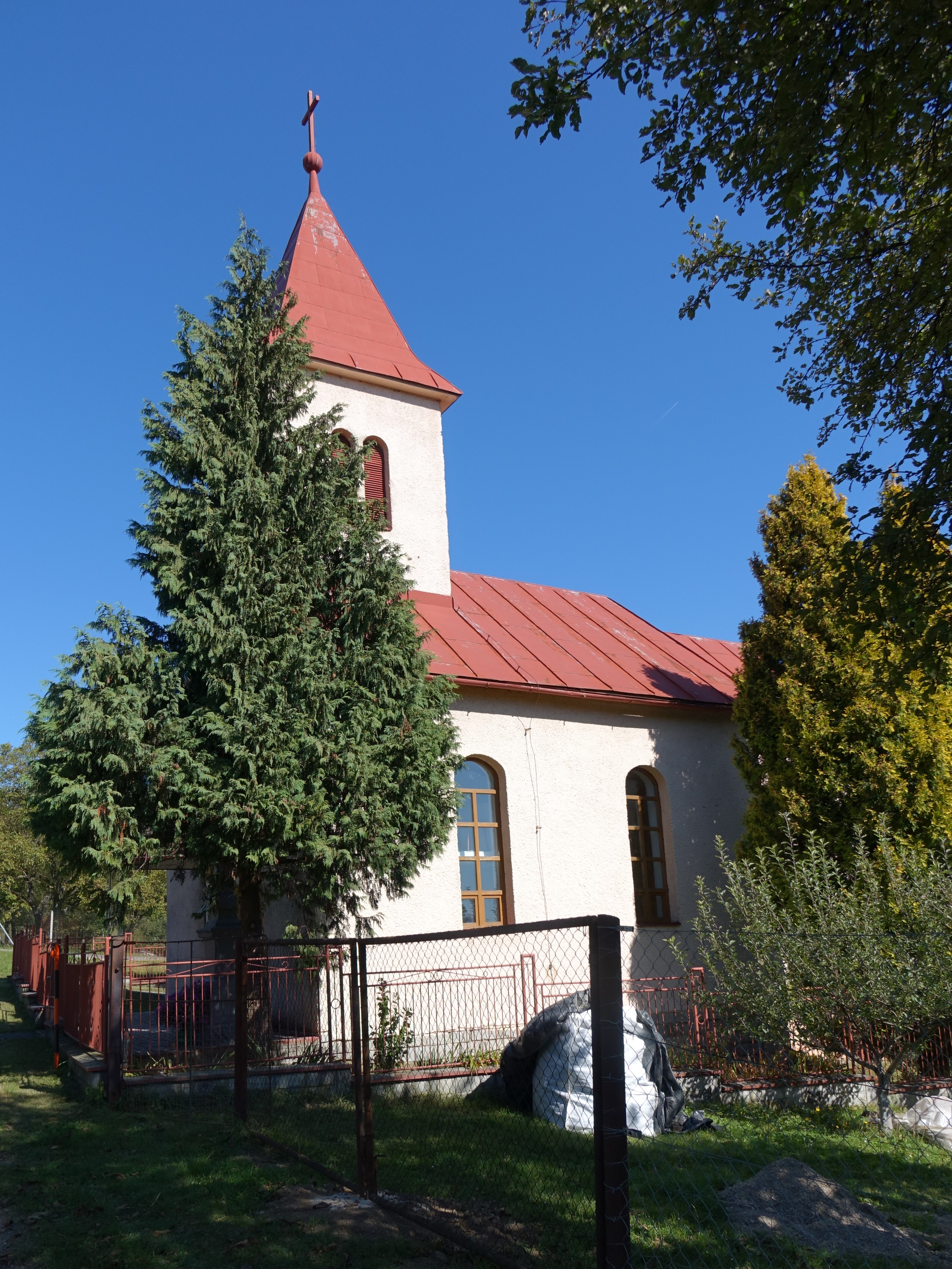

- Flag

- Location of Radvanovce in the Prešov Region Location of Radvanovce in Slovakia
- Coordinates: 49.05°N 21.47°E
- Country: Slovakia
- Region: Prešov Region
- District: Vranov nad Topľou District
- First mentioned: 1349

Area
  - Total: 4.80 km^{2} (1.85 sq mi)
- Elevation: 276 m (906 ft)

Population (2025)
  - Total: 213
- Time zone: UTC+1 (CET)
  - Summer (DST): UTC+2 (CEST)
- Postal code: 943 1
- Area code: +421 57
- Vehicle registration plate (until 2022): VT
- Website: obecradvanovce.sk

Radvanovce (Hungarian: Tapolyradvány) is a village and municipality in Vranov nad Topľou District in the Prešov Region of eastern Slovakia.

== History ==
In historical records the village was first mentioned in 1349.

== Geography ==
The municipality lies at an altitude of 276 metres (906 ft) and covers an area of 4.80 km^{2} (1.85 sq mi) (2025).

== Population ==
Population statistic (10 years)
Year	1995	2005	2015	2025
Count	179	203	213	213
Difference		+13.40%	+4.92%	+0%

Population statistic
Year	2024	2025
Count	213	213
Difference		+0%

It has a population of 213 people (31 December 2025).

=== Ethnicity ===
Census 2021 (1+ %)
Ethnicity	Number	Fraction
Slovak	209	95.87%
Not found out	8	3.66%
Czech	3	1.37%
Rusyn	3	1.37%
Total	218	

In year 2021 was 218 people by ethnicity 209 as Slovak, 8 as Not found out, 3 as Czech, 3 as Rusyn, 2 as Russian and 1 as Hungarian.

Note on population: The difference values of population numbers in the table "Population statistic" and in the sections "Ethnicity" & "Religion" is caused by the use of various statistical methods.

=== Religion ===
Census 2021 (1+ %)
Religion	Number	Fraction
Roman Catholic Church	105	48.17%
Evangelical Church	82	37.61%
None	14	6.42%
Not found out	9	4.13%
Jehovah's Witnesses	4	1.83%
Greek Catholic Church	4	1.83%
Total	218	

In year 2021 was 218 people by religion 105 from Roman Catholic Church, 82 from Evangelical Church, 14 from None, 9 from Not found out, 4 from Jehovah's Witnesses and 4 from Greek Catholic Church.
