= Kladzany =

- Municipality
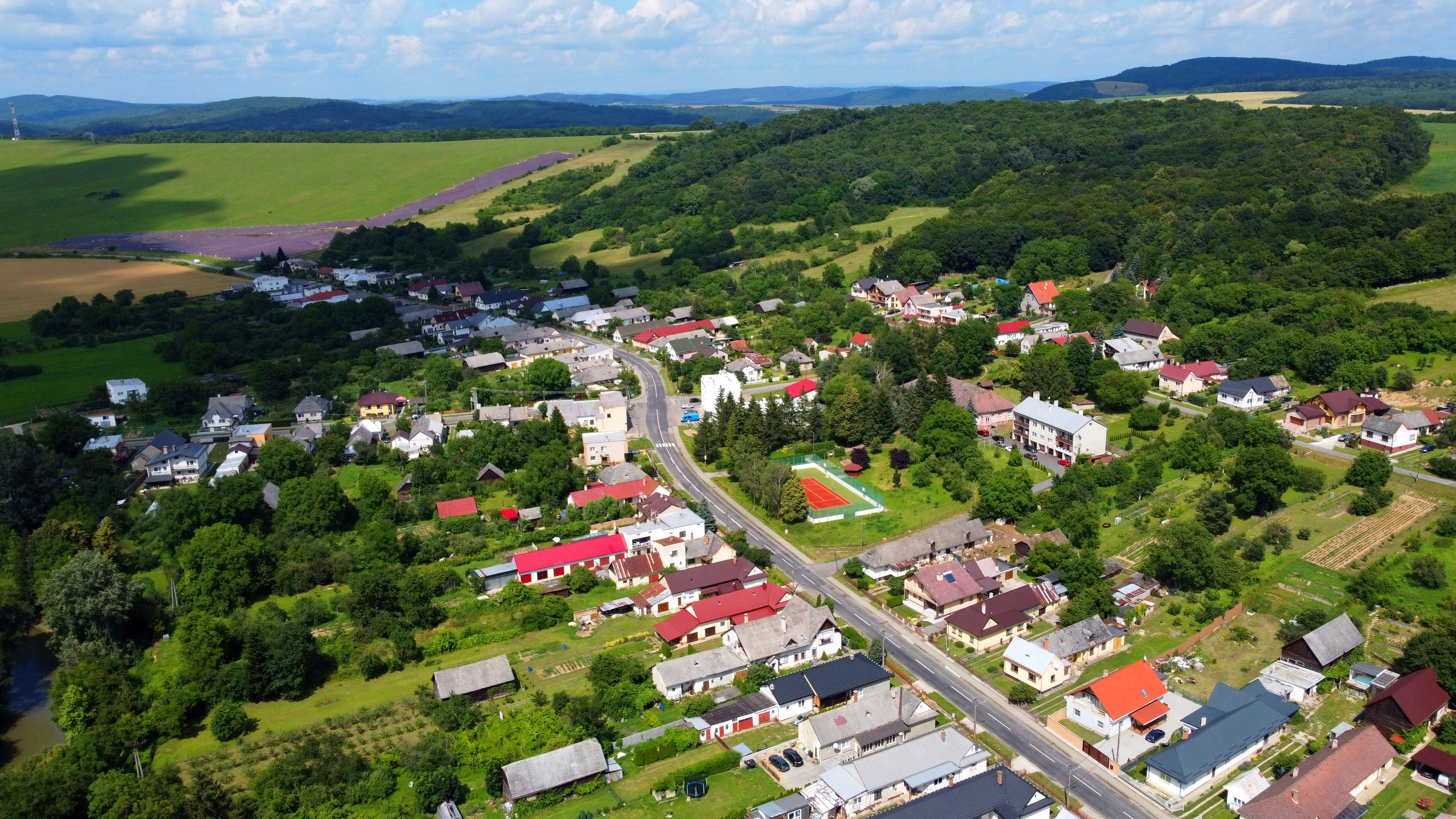

- Flag Coat of arms

- Location of Kladzany in the Prešov Region Location of Kladzany in Slovakia
- Coordinates: 48.88°N 21.75°E
- Country: Slovakia
- Region: Prešov Region
- District: Vranov nad Topľou District
- First mentioned: 1391

Area
  - Total: 5.35 km^{2} (2.07 sq mi)
- Elevation: 121 m (397 ft)

Population (2025)
  - Total: 536
- Time zone: UTC+1 (CET)
  - Summer (DST): UTC+2 (CEST)
- Postal code: 942 1
- Area code: +421 57
- Vehicle registration plate (until 2022): VT
- Website: www.kladzany.sk

Kladzany (Hungarian: Klazány) is a village and municipality in Vranov nad Topľou District in the Prešov Region of eastern Slovakia.

== History ==
In historical records the village was first mentioned in 1391.

== Geography ==
The municipality lies at an altitude of 121 metres (397 ft) and covers an area of 5.35 km^{2} (2.07 sq mi) (2025).

== Population ==
Population statistic (10 years)
Year	1995	2005	2015	2025
Count	614	568	533	536
Difference		−7.49%	−6.16%	+0.56%

Population statistic
Year	2024	2025
Count	529	536
Difference		+1.32%

It has a population of 536 people (31 December 2025).

=== Ethnicity ===
Census 2021 (1+ %)
Ethnicity	Number	Fraction
Slovak	519	96.82%
Not found out	16	2.98%
Total	536	

In year 2021 was 536 people by ethnicity 519 as Slovak, 16 as Not found out, 3 as Hungarian, 2 as Czech and 2 as Rusyn.

Note on population: The difference values of population numbers in the table "Population statistic" and in the sections "Ethnicity" & "Religion" is caused by the use of various statistical methods.

=== Religion ===
Census 2021 (1+ %)
Religion	Number	Fraction
Evangelical Church	312	58.21%
Roman Catholic Church	113	21.08%
None	37	6.9%
Jehovah's Witnesses	28	5.22%
Greek Catholic Church	19	3.54%
Not found out	14	2.61%
Total	536	

In year 2021 was 536 people by religion 312 from Evangelical Church, 113 from Roman Catholic Church, 37 from None, 28 from Jehovah's Witnesses, 19 from Greek Catholic Church, 14 from Not found out, 4 from Other, 4 from Seventh-day Adventist Church, 3 from Apostolic Church and 2 from Buddhism.

== Genealogical resources ==
The records for genealogical research are available at the state archive "Statny Archiv in Presov, Slovakia"

- Roman Catholic church records (births/marriages/deaths): 1827-1895 (parish B)
- Greek Catholic church records (births/marriages/deaths): 1855-1925 (parish B)
- Lutheran church records (births/marriages/deaths): 1805-1925 (parish A)

== See also ==
- List of municipalities and towns in Slovakia
