= Vyšný Kazimír =

Village and municipality in Slovakia

- Municipality
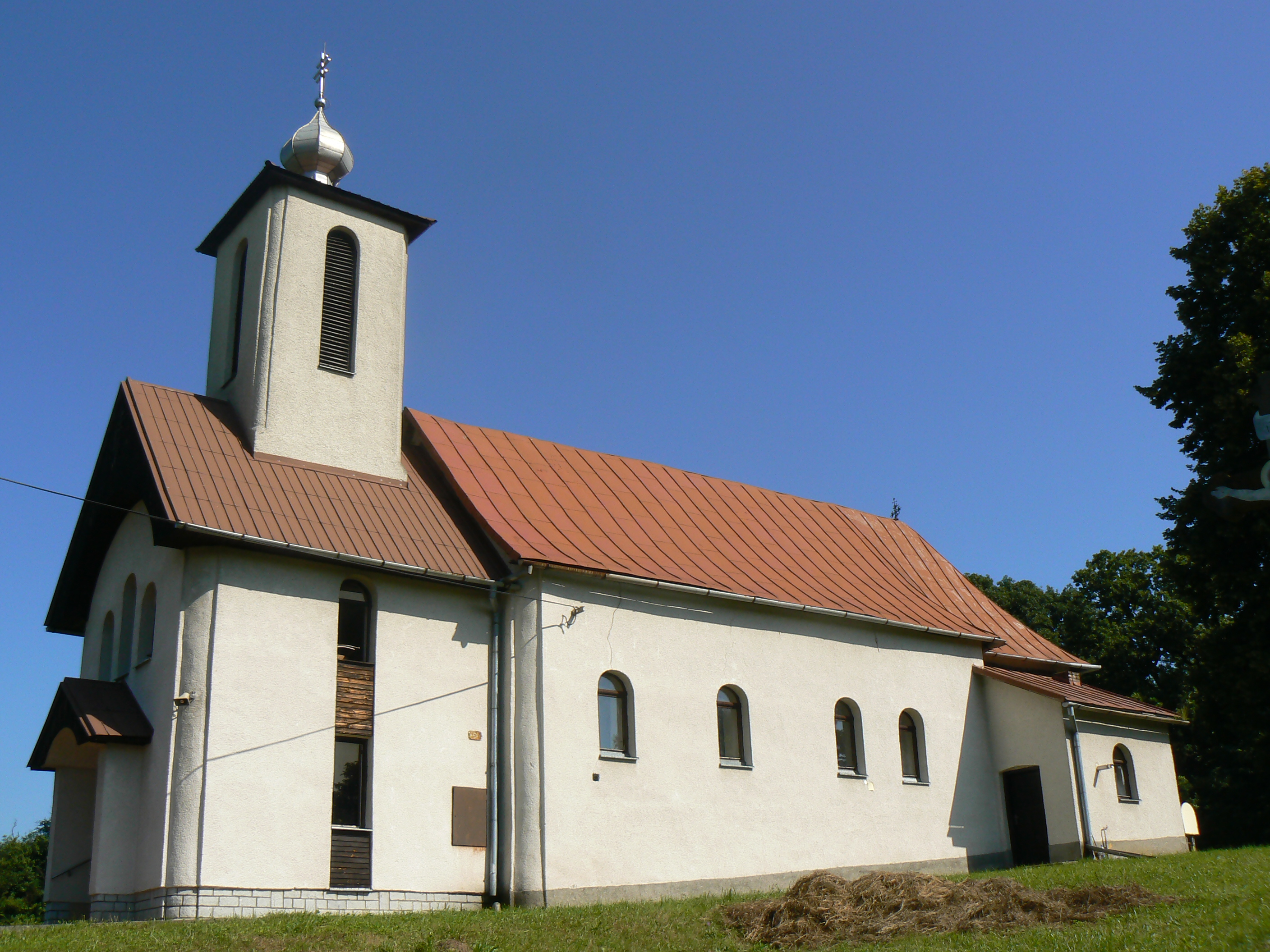

- Flag

- Location of Vyšný Kazimír in the Prešov Region Location of Vyšný Kazimír in Slovakia
- Coordinates: 48.93°N 21.68°E
- Country: Slovakia
- Region: Prešov Region
- District: Vranov nad Topľou District
- First mentioned: 1363

Area
  - Total: 7.55 km^{2} (2.92 sq mi)
- Elevation: 201 m (659 ft)

Population (2025)
  - Total: 197
- Time zone: UTC+1 (CET)
  - Summer (DST): UTC+2 (CEST)
- Postal code: 940 9
- Area code: +421 57
- Vehicle registration plate (until 2022): VT
- Website: www.vysnykazimir.eu

Vyšný Kazimír (Hungarian: Felsőkázmér) is a village and municipality in Vranov nad Topľou District in the Prešov Region of eastern Slovakia.

== History ==
In historical records the village was first mentioned in 1363.

== Geography ==
The municipality lies at an altitude of 201 metres (659 ft) and covers an area of 7.55 km^{2} (2.92 sq mi) (2025).

== Population ==
Population statistic (10 years)
Year	1995	2005	2015	2025
Count	196	212	198	197
Difference		+8.16%	−6.60%	−0.50%

Population statistic
Year	2024	2025
Count	190	197
Difference		+3.68%

It has a population of 197 people (31 December 2025).

=== Ethnicity ===
Census 2021 (1+ %)
Ethnicity	Number	Fraction
Slovak	185	98.4%
Not found out	3	1.59%
English	2	1.06%
Total	188	

In year 2021 was 188 people by ethnicity 185 as Slovak, 3 as Not found out, 2 as English, 1 as Czech and 1 as Rusyn.

Note on population: The difference values of population numbers in the table "Population statistic" and in the sections "Ethnicity" & "Religion" is caused by the use of various statistical methods.

=== Religion ===
Census 2021 (1+ %)
Religion	Number	Fraction
Greek Catholic Church	119	63.3%
Roman Catholic Church	57	30.32%
None	6	3.19%
Not found out	3	1.6%
Evangelical Church	2	1.06%
Total	188	

In year 2021 was 188 people by religion 119 from Greek Catholic Church, 57 from Roman Catholic Church, 6 from None, 3 from Not found out, 2 from Evangelical Church and 1 from Ad hoc movements.
