= Čierne nad Topľou =

- Municipality
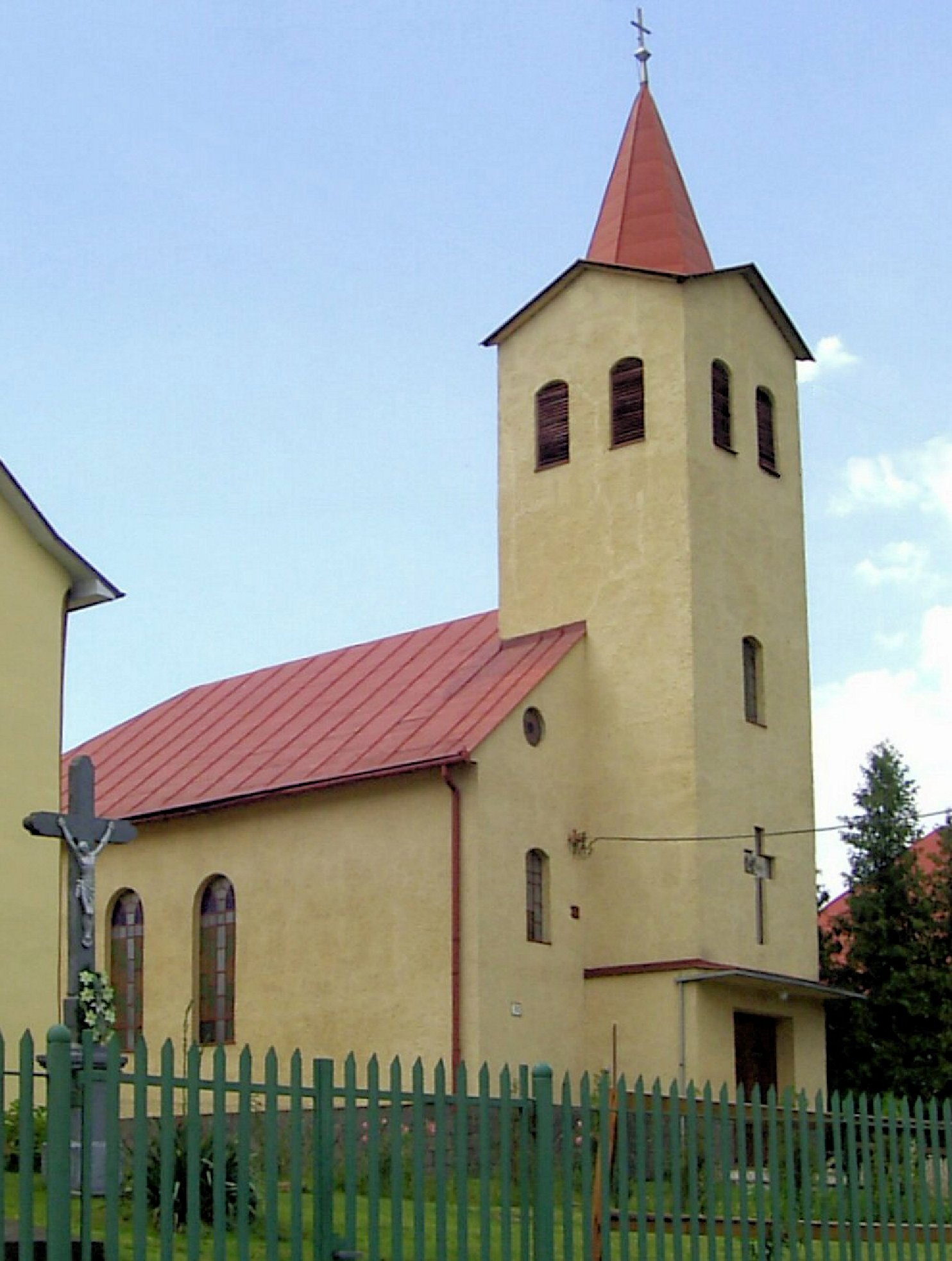

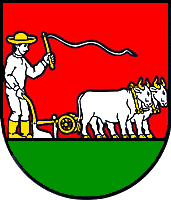
- Flag Coat of arms

- Location of Čierne nad Topľou in the Prešov Region Location of Čierne nad Topľou in Slovakia
- Coordinates: 49.00°N 21.57°E
- Country: Slovakia
- Region: Prešov Region
- District: Vranov nad Topľou District
- First mentioned: 1399

Area
  - Total: 8.33 km^{2} (3.22 sq mi)
- Elevation: 158 m (518 ft)

Population (2025)
  - Total: 729
- Time zone: UTC+1 (CET)
  - Summer (DST): UTC+2 (CEST)
- Postal code: 943 4
- Area code: +421 57
- Vehicle registration plate (until 2022): VT
- Website: www.ciernenadtoplou.sk

Čierne nad Topľou (Hungarian: Felsőfeketepatak) is a village and municipality in Vranov nad Topľou District in the Prešov Region of eastern Slovakia.

== History ==
In historical records the village was first mentioned in 1399.

== Geography ==
The municipality lies at an altitude of 158 metres (518 ft) and covers an area of 8.33 km^{2} (3.22 sq mi) (2025).

== Population ==
Population statistic (10 years)
| Year | 1995 | 2005 | 2015 | 2025 |
|---|---|---|---|---|
| Count | 815 | 795 | 744 | 729 |
| Difference | | −2.45% | −6.41% | −2.01% |

Population statistic
| Year | 2024 | 2025 |
|---|---|---|
| Count | 711 | 729 |
| Difference | | +2.53% |

It has a population of 729 people (31 December 2025).

=== Ethnicity ===
Census 2021 (1+ %)
| Ethnicity | Number | Fraction |
|---|---|---|
| Slovak | 709 | 98.6% |
| Total | 719 | |

In year 2021 was 719 people by ethnicity 709 as Slovak, 7 as Not found out, 6 as Czech, 4 as Ukrainian, 4 as Rusyn, 1 as Russian, 1 as German and 1 as Croatian.

Note on population: The difference values of population numbers in the table "Population statistic" and in the sections "Ethnicity" & "Religion" is caused by the use of various statistical methods.

=== Religion ===
Census 2021 (1+ %)
| Religion | Number | Fraction |
|---|---|---|
| Evangelical Church | 506 | 70.38% |
| Roman Catholic Church | 132 | 18.36% |
| Greek Catholic Church | 28 | 3.89% |
| None | 28 | 3.89% |
| Total | 719 | |

In year 2021 was 719 people by religion 506 from Evangelical Church, 132 from Roman Catholic Church, 28 from Greek Catholic Church, 28 from None, 7 from Not found out, 6 from Church of the Brethren, 5 from Eastern Orthodox Church, 3 from Jehovah's Witnesses, 1 from Other and not ascertained christian church, 1 from Other, 1 from United Methodist Church and 1 from Apostolic Church.

== See also ==
- List of municipalities and towns in Slovakia

== Genealogical resources ==
The records for genealogical research are available at the state archive "Statny Archiv in Presov, Slovakia"

- Roman Catholic church records (births/marriages/deaths): 1818-1898 (parish B)
- Greek Catholic church records (births/marriages/deaths): 1807-1951 (parish B)
- Lutheran church records (births/marriages/deaths): 1810-1896 (parish B)
