= Piskorovce =

- Municipality
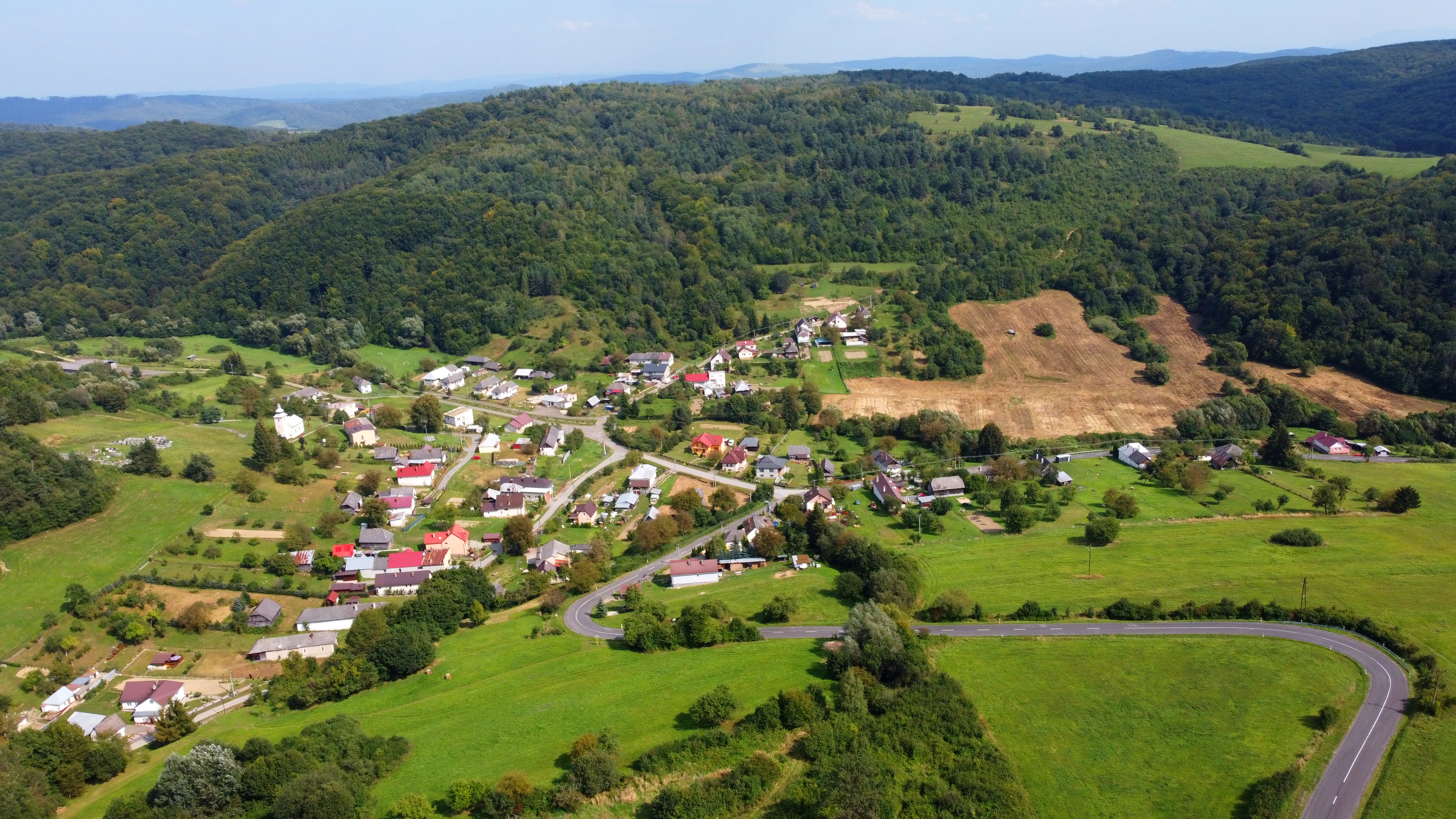

- Flag

- Location of Piskorovce in the Prešov Region Location of Piskorovce in Slovakia
- Coordinates: 49.12°N 21.73°E
- Country: Slovakia
- Region: Prešov Region
- District: Vranov nad Topľou District
- First mentioned: 1408

Area
  - Total: 7.67 km^{2} (2.96 sq mi)
- Elevation: 244 m (801 ft)

Population (2025)
  - Total: 110
- Time zone: UTC+1 (CET)
  - Summer (DST): UTC+2 (CEST)
- Postal code: 940 5
- Area code: +421 57
- Vehicle registration plate (until 2022): VT
- Website: obecpiskorovce.sk

Piskorovce (Hungarian: Királyhegy, until 1899: Piszkorócz) is a village and municipality in Vranov nad Topľou District in the Prešov Region of eastern Slovakia.

== History ==
In historical records the village was first mentioned in 1408.

== Geography ==
The municipality lies at an altitude of 244 metres (801 ft) and covers an area of 7.67 km^{2} (2.96 sq mi) (2025).

== Population ==
Population statistic (10 years)
Year	1995	2005	2015	2025
Count	159	159	133	110
Difference		+0%	−16.35%	−17.29%

Population statistic
Year	2024	2025
Count	112	110
Difference		−1.78%

It has a population of 110 people (31 December 2025).

=== Ethnicity ===
Census 2021 (1+ %)
Ethnicity	Number	Fraction
Slovak	108	92.3%
Rusyn	37	31.62%
Not found out	2	1.7%
Total	117	

In year 2021 was 117 people by ethnicity 108 as Slovak, 37 as Rusyn, 2 as Not found out, 1 as German and 1 as Other.

Note on population: The difference values of population numbers in the table "Population statistic" and in the sections "Ethnicity" & "Religion" is caused by the use of various statistical methods.

=== Religion ===
Census 2021 (1+ %)
Religion	Number	Fraction
Greek Catholic Church	103	88.03%
Roman Catholic Church	9	7.69%
Eastern Orthodox Church	2	1.71%
Not found out	2	1.71%
Total	117	

In year 2021 was 117 people by religion 103 from Greek Catholic Church, 9 from Roman Catholic Church, 2 from Eastern Orthodox Church, 2 from Not found out and 1 from None.
