= Rusyn national awakening =

National revival in the Austro-Hungarian empire

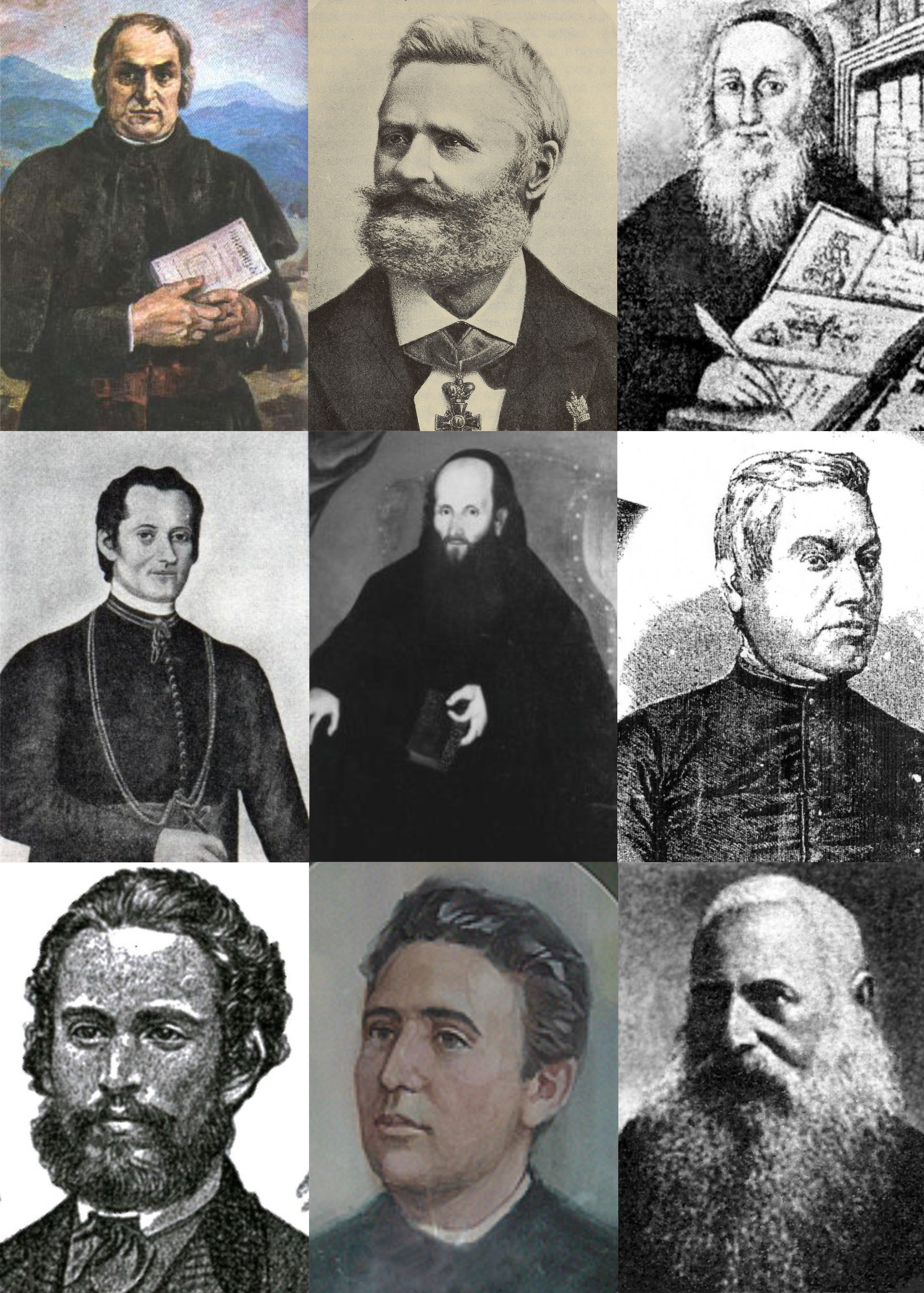
Alexander Dukhnovych, Adolf Dobriansky, Ioannikii Bazilovich, Ivan Churhovich, Arsenii Kotsak, Ioann Rakovskyi, Viktor Kimak, Yuli Stavrovsky-Popradov, Ivan Silvai

Rusyn national awakening (Rusyn: русиньске народне возроджіня, rusyn'ske narodne vozrodzhinya) was a process of national revival that shaped the national identity, culture, and literature of the Rusyn people within Austria-Hungary between the 1840s and 1890s. Its leaders sought to inspire national consciousness among the population living in the northeastern borderlands of Hungary and to promote greater autonomy for the Rusyn nation within the Hungarian kingdom. These leaders, known as national awakeners, were primarily educated clergy, politicians, and writers.

Unlike other Slavic national revivals, where most awakeners embraced nationalism, Rusyn awakeners were divided by the influences they supported. Russophiles advocated for the integration of Rusyns into the Russian nation, with prominent figures such as Alexander Dukhnovych, Alexander Pavlovich, and, in his later years, Adolf Dobriansky. In contrast, Rusynophiles emphasized the cultural and linguistic uniqueness of the Rusyns in relation to other Slavic peoples, represented by figures like Mikhail Luchkay, Victor Dobriansky, and Yuri Žatkovich. The dominance of Russophiles during this period hindered the development of a standardized Rusyn literary language, focusing instead on fostering national awareness among the Rusyn population.

The revival was preceded by a brief Rusyn Enlightenment. Key figures of this period included Bishop Andriy Bachinskyi, who implemented educational reforms in Subcarpathian Rus, introducing Rusyn as a language of instruction in schools. Toward the end of his life, Bachinskyi established a diocesan archive and library, which fostered a circle of Rusyn intellectuals, including Ioannikii Bazilovich, Ioann Kutka, Arsenii Kotsak, and Ioann Pastelii.

The Rusyn National Revival began in the 1830s and reached its political peak during the Hungarian Revolution of 1848–1849. Adolf Dobriansky led delegations that twice presented memoranda to Emperor Franz Joseph I, seeking recognition of the Rusyns as a distinct nation within Hungary. While these efforts achieved some short-term political success, the Austro-Hungarian Compromise of 1867 marked the decline of political activism within the revival movement.

Literary activities during the revival were more enduring. Through the efforts of literary societies, numerous historiographical, didactic, and poetic works were produced, with Alexander Dukhnovych playing a leading role. However, Dukhnovych's preference for the Russian language and the constructed hybrid language known as Iazychie over a standardized Rusyn literary language influenced his contemporaries, who followed his example.

The end of the Rusyn National Revival is generally placed in the late 1890s, coinciding with the onset of large-scale emigration to North America and increased Magyarization in Hungary. The last purely revivalist works were produced by figures such as Eugen Fencik and the so-called Magyarons, a group of Rusyn intellectuals aligned with Hungarian culture, who published the weekly Kelet.

Following the conclusion of the revival, extensive emigration to the United States and Canada ensued, followed by a renewed phase of Rusyn political activity after the incorporation of Subcarpathian Rus into Czechoslovakia.

== Rusyn enlightenment ==
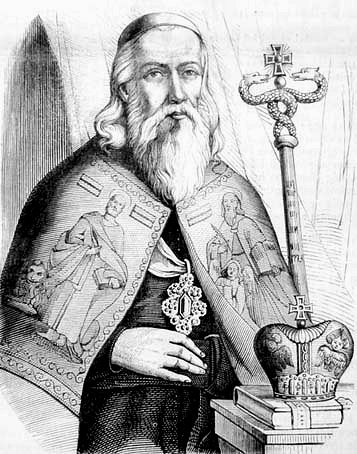
Andriy Bachinskyi, one of the greatest Rusyn Enlightenment figures, was a bishop of the Mukachevo Eparchy, translator, and the founder of the episcopal archive and library in Uzhhorod.

Following a series of wars in the mid-18th century, Austrian Empress Maria Theresa initiated sweeping reforms to modernize the Habsburg monarchy. This period coincided with the spread of the Enlightenment, a philosophical movement emphasizing reason and progress, which influenced all aspects of life. In 1777, Maria Theresa enacted a new educational reform for Hungary. Bishop Andriy Bachinskyi was tasked with implementing this reform in Subcarpathian Rus. Under his leadership, Rusyn was introduced as the language of instruction in Uzhhorod schools and became the official language of the bishopric's administration. Bachinskyi also published a translation of the Bible in Iazychie, an artificially constructed language combining Church Slavonic and Rusyn. Toward the end of his life, he established a diocesan archive and library, fostering a circle of Rusyn intellectuals, including Ioannikii Bazilovich, Ioann Kutka, Arsenii Kotsak, and Ioann Pastelii. These figures are regarded as the first Rusyn awakeners, although their efforts did not gain widespread support at the time. Bazilovich authored historiographical works on the Rusyns and the Mukachevo Eparchy, Kotsak wrote five grammar textbooks for Church Slavonic (Note: The work Slavenorussian Grammar has Arsenii Kotsak regarded as the first Rusyn grammar. However, the book is primarily a grammar of Church Slavonic with elements of Rusyn, rather than a full representation of the Rusyn language. It does not align with the artificially constructed Iazychie, a hybrid language that combined Church Slavonic and Rusyn elements, as Iazychie emerged only after the author's death.), Kutka created the first Rusyn primer and a catechism in Rusyn, and Pastelii produced historical works and elegies, such as Elegy in Honor of Emperor Joseph II, Historia Diocesis Muncasiensis, and De origine Ruthenorum.

== The course of the awakening ==
The beginning of the Rusyn national awakening can be dated to the 1830s, when, in response to increasing Magyarization, the first awakeners emerged, striving to preserve and develop national consciousness.

The first two prominent figures emerged: Mikhail Luchkay and Ivan Churhovich. Churhovich promoted Rusyn national awareness through sermons in churches and at the Uzhhorod Gymnasium. He also sought to establish a Rusyn printing press and newspapers. Luchkay, by contrast, focused on writing, producing works in Latin and Iazychie rather than in Rusyn. In the 1830s, Luchkay authored Grammatica Slavo-Ruthena, History of Carpathian Rusyns, and a Rusyn-Latin-Hungarian-German dictionary.

Other intellectuals of the period were captivated by Pan-Slavic ideas. Figures such as Ivan Orlai, Yuriy Venelin, and Joann Fogarashi-Berezhanin were among the first to advocate for unifying the Hungarian Rusyns with the Russian nation. Their ideology stemmed from the self-identification of Rusyns with terms like "Rusyn" and "Rusnak," which shared a linguistic root with "Rus," symbolizing Russia and its traditions. This perspective has persisted among some Rusyn nationalists, including contemporary figures like Dimitry Sydor and Petro Getsko.

In 1847, during the rise of Magyarization policies in Hungary, some priests from the Mukachevo Eparchy supported the Hungarian nationalist Lajos Kossuth. However, the Greek Catholic priest Alexander Dukhnovych from Prešov opposed Magyarization, focusing instead on education and the preservation of his native language. That same year, Dukhnovych published a school textbook, Reader for Beginners (Rusyn: Knyzhytsia chytalnaia dlia nachynaiushchykh). Unlike his predecessors, who primarily wrote in Church Slavonic, Dukhnovych chose to write in Prosta Mova, the vernacular language understood by common Rusyn peasants. This marked a significant step toward making education accessible to the wider population.

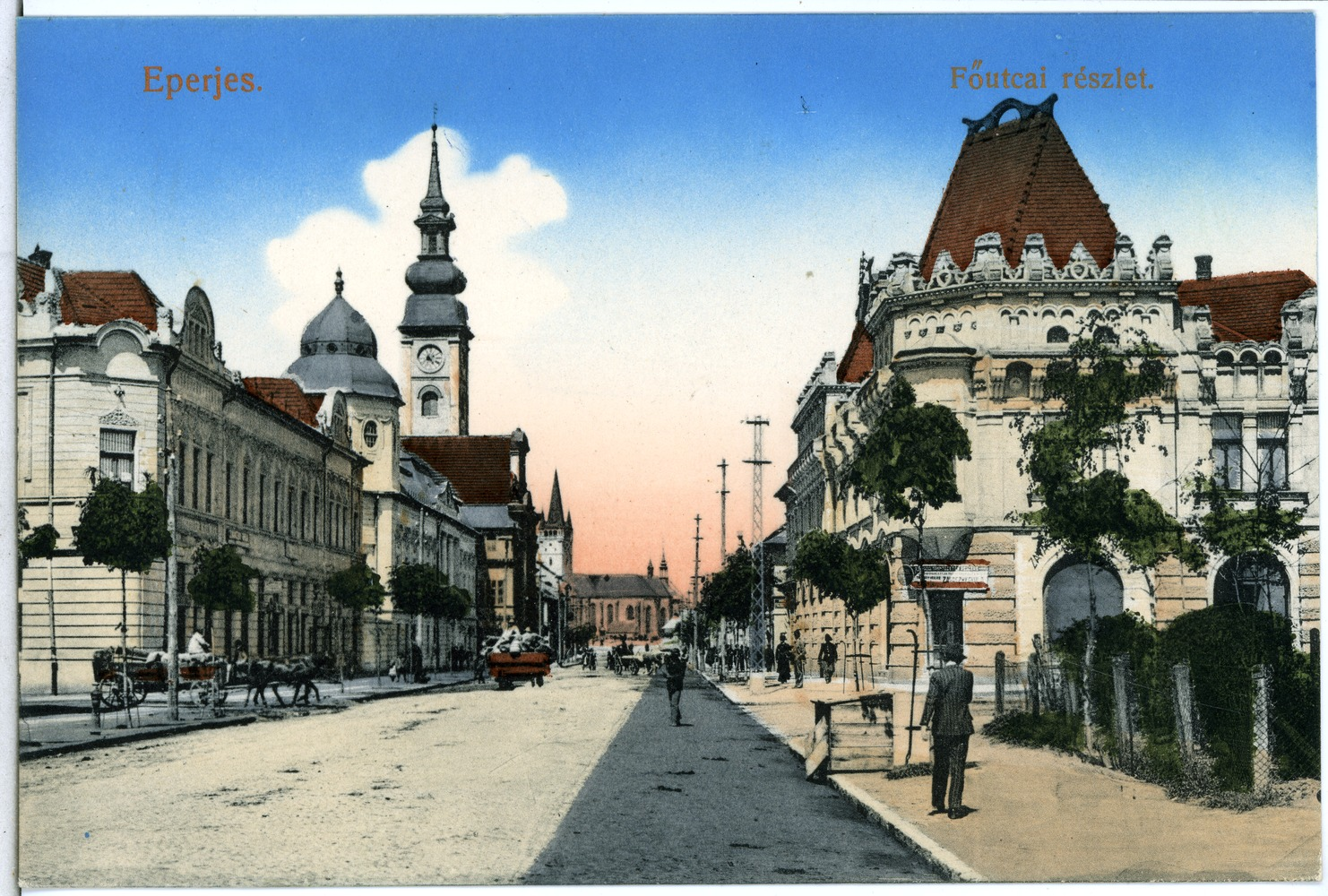
Prešov, one of the cultural centers of awakening. In the photo, you can see the bell tower of the Cathedral of Saint John the Baptist, and the main nave of the Co-Cathedral of Saint Nicholas

In March 1848, the Hungarian Revolution broke out, marking the rise of the national awakening in the Hungarian Rus. Lajos Kossuth and other insurgents issued decrees known as the March Laws, which ensured freedom of speech, the abolition of serfdom, and other reforms. The abolition of serfdom had the greatest impact on the Rusyns, transforming them into free peasants.

This newfound freedom significantly affected the educated classes and clergy, especially Greek Catholic priests from the Prešov and Mukachevo Eparchies. They sided with Hungary and supported the rebels, whose reforms granted them greater religious and political freedom. Viktor Dobriansky also supported the Hungarian rebels, declaring in the Hungarian newspaper Budapesti Hiradó: "Hungarian freedom is dearer to us than Russian autocracy, and the milder Hungarian climate is preferable to Siberian winters." However, the loyalty of Viktor Dobriansky and other supporters of Hungary was overshadowed by the actions of his brother, Adolf Dobriansky. In the 1840s, Adolf built his career in central Slovakia, where he held strong anti-Hungarian views and collaborated with many leaders of the Slovak national awakening. Because of him, supporters of the Hungarian regime found themselves in opposition. When Adolf Dobriansky sought to run for the Hungarian Parliament representing a Slovak region, his candidacy was rejected, and he, along with his friends from the Slovak national awakening, was accused of supporting Pan-Slavism. These accusations prevented him from participating in significant events, most notably the Slavic Congress in Prague in 1848, which occurred without the presence of a single Rusyn. At the congress, however, František Palacký and Jozef Miloslav Hurban voiced their support for the Rusyns. Palacký specifically defended Adolf Dobriansky, while Hurban advocated for equality among the Hungarians, Slovaks, and Rusyns.

By the end of 1848, Adolf Dobriansky moved to Prešov, where he began drafting a memorandum and political program intended to be presented to the Austrian Emperor Franz Joseph I.

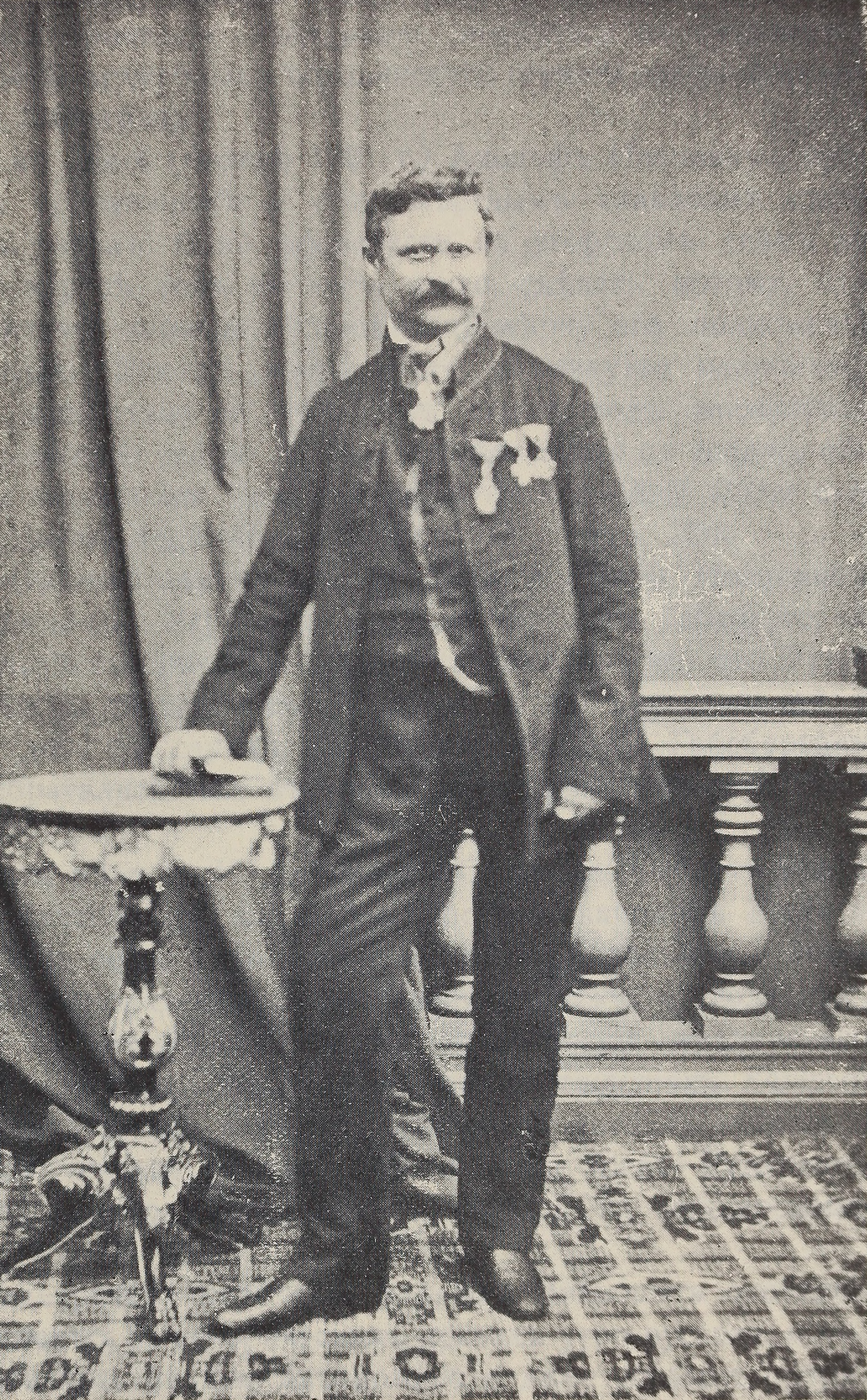
Adolf Dobriansky was one of the most significant politicians during the awakening

=== Rusyn Memoranda in Vienna in 1849 ===
At the beginning of 1849 in Prešov, a memorandum and political program advocating for the recognition of the Rusyns in the Austrian Empire was drafted. This memorandum was presented by a Rusyn delegation in Vienna to Austrian Emperor Franz Joseph I in Vienna. The members of the delegation included Adolf Dobriansky, Viktor Dobriansky, Mikhail Visianik, Jozef Sholtes, and Alexander Yanitsky.

The memorandum was first presented to the Emperor on January 29, 1849, in Vienna. The delegation demanded the creation of a unified principality or administrative region that would combine the territories of the Hungarian Rusyns with those Rusyns from Galicia and Bukovina. The memorandum also addressed the issue of recognizing the Rusyns as a distinct group. The memorandum gained support from the Rusyn intelligentsia, the Greek Catholic Eparchy of Prešov led by Bishop Jozef Gaganec, and the Supreme Rusyn Council in Galicia, which also represented the Rusyns of Bukovina. However, Austrian Emperor Franz Joseph I rejected the memorandum, as he was unwilling to create new administrative units that would merge Austrian Galicia with the former territories of the Kingdom of Hungary.

Despite this, the Austrian Empire viewed Adolf Dobriansky as a political ally, and as long as the Austrian army controlled the territories of Galicia and Hungarian Rus, Rusyn national and cultural interests were supported. After the Hungarian Revolution was crushed at the Battle of Világos, Adolf Dobriansky returned to Vienna and presented another memorandum to the Emperor. This second memorandum, titled The Memorial of the Hungarian Rusyns, focused solely on the Rusyns of Hungarian Rus. It called for the recognition of the Rusyn ethnicity in Hungary, the creation of a separate Rusyn administrative region within Hungary with Rusyn officials, and the use of the Rusyn language in schools and government offices as the official language of the region.

=== Uzhhorod district ===
Austrian Emperor Franz Joseph I accepted the memorandum, and in October 1849, at the request of Alexander Bach, the Uzhhorod District was established. The district encompassed the counties of Ung, Bereg, Ugocsa, and Maramoros. The first administrator of the district was Baron Ignaz von Villetz, while Adolf Dobriansky served as his advisor and head of the administrator's office. Dobriansky ordered the replacement of Hungarian street name signs with trilingual versions that included Rusyn, Hungarian, and German names. He also tried to appoint Rusyn representatives to administrative positions. For example, his brother Viktor Dobriansky became the chief school prosecutor. However, Bishop Vasyl Popovych of the Mukachevo Eparchy strongly opposed filling administrative roles exclusively with Rusyns. Popovych argued that Dobriansky's actions would erode the trust of Slovak and Hungarian communities in the Greek Catholic Church.

The Mukachevo Eparchy, which was significantly pro-Hungarian and pro-Austrian, did not view the Rusyn political awakening as a positive development. In response to the criticism, Adolf Dobriansky relented and began appointing Hungarians and Slovaks to administrative positions as well.

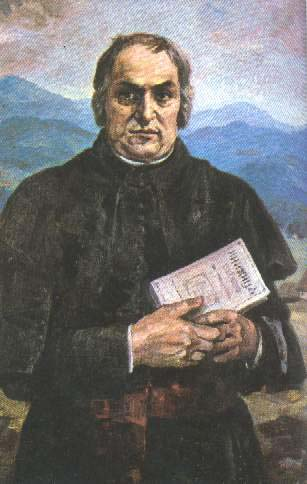
Alexander Dukhnovych was the most significant protagonist during the awakening, and author of Rusyn anthem and motto "I was, am, and will remain a Rusyn!" Ivan Franko said that he did everything "...to ensure that the dead Rusyns would be spiritually revived."

Meanwhile, Alexander Dukhnovych advocated for teaching Rusyn history and language at the Prešov gymnasium. (Note: Alexander Dukhnovych, following the intervention of Russian forces against the Hungarian Revolution, developed strong Russophile views. Therefore, it was not merely an unspecified Rusyn language, but also a new literary Carpatho-Rusyn dialect of Russian.) In January 1850, in cooperation with Galician Russophiles living in Vienna, he began publishing a journal called Vistnyk. The journal had a strong Slavophile orientation, and Dukhnovych wrote extensively about the status of Rusyns within the Hungarian Kingdom. In Budapest, another strongly Slavophile publication called Zemskyi pravytel'stvennyi chasopis dle korolestva Uharskaho (Iazychie Земскій правительственный часописъ длѣ королевства Угорскаго) was published by Ioann Rakovsky, a national awakener of the Russophile movement.

On March 28, 1850, the Uzhhorod District, along with other political districts, was abolished at the request of Alexander Bach. The Rusyn intelligentsia described this decision as a disaster in Uzhhorod, severely impacting the emerging Rusyn national awakening.

=== Russophilia ===
In mid-June 1849, Russian troops began gathering in the Carpathians, near the Dukla and Lupkov Passes, preparing for an intervention in Hungary to aid the Austrian Empire. Rusyn peasants gathered in villages and towns to witness the arrival of the Russian army. Strong Hungarian anti-Russian propaganda ultimately led to greater unity among the Rusyns, both in terms of their national consciousness and their support for Pan-Slavism and Russophilia.

The arrival of Slavic troops sparked a strong trend of popular Russophilism in the Lemko Region and Hungarian Rus, similar to the Russophilism that was already prevalent in Galicia at that time. The main proponent of this new popular Russophilism was Alexander Dukhnovych. He described his view and reaction to the Russian troops in Prešov as follows: "It was, I tell you, the first and perhaps the last joy of my soul, the one that will remain in my memory forever."

=== Rusyn literary societies ===
After the political failure of the national awakening following the dissolution of the Uzhhorod District, literary production in the Rusyn language and its variants continued. (Note: Other variants of the Rusyn language include Iazychie or the Carpatho-Rusyn dialect of Russian (Russian with some Rusyn words).) In 1850, Alexander Dukhnovych published the first Rusyn almanac, a calendar work titled Pozdravlenie Rusynov na god 1850. It featured poems such as Subcarpathian Rusyns, Abandon Your Deep Slumber, now recognized as the Rusyn anthem, as well as the poem Vruchanie, which includes the iconic words "I was, am, and will remain a Rusyn!"

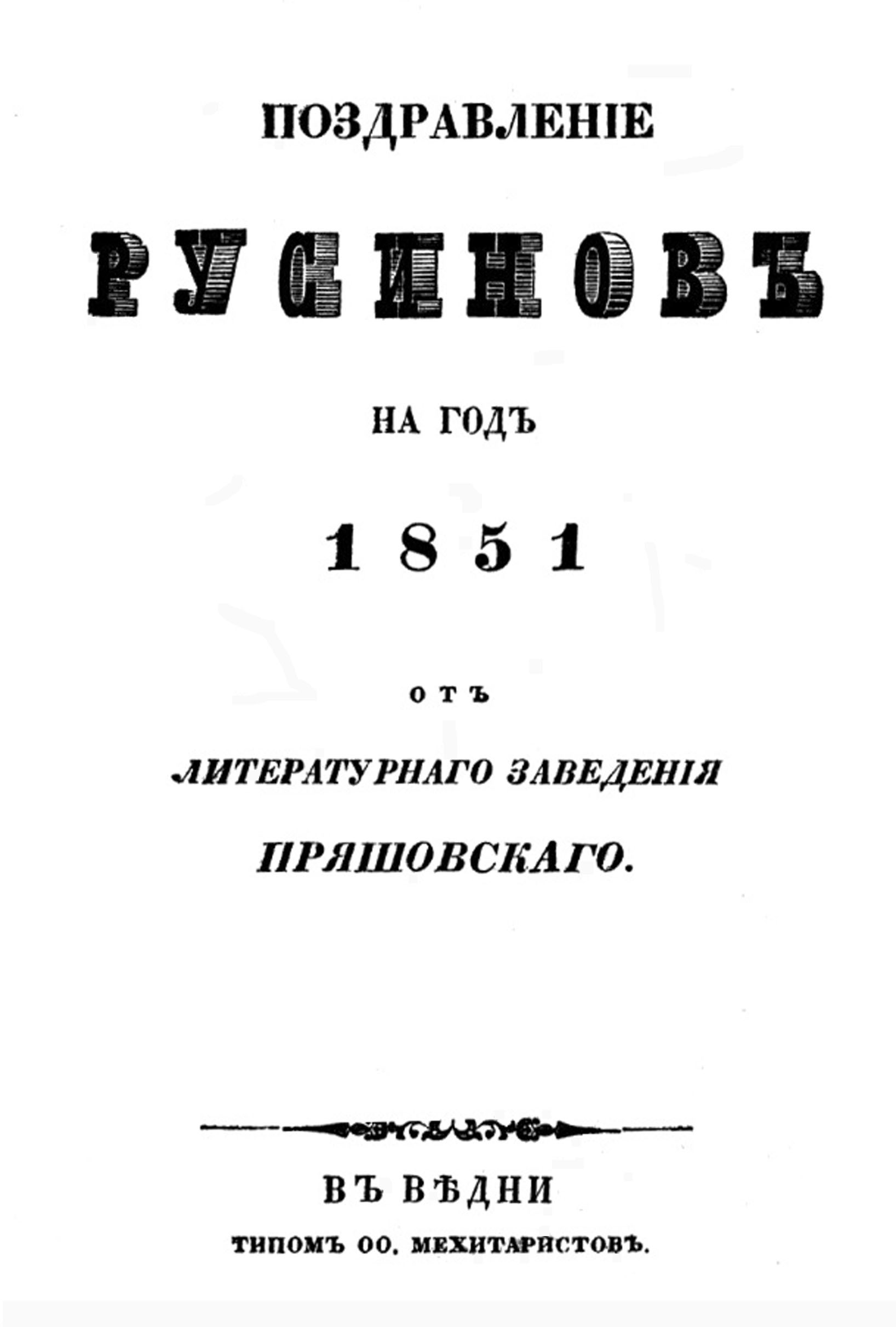
Rusyn almanac Pozdravlenie Rusynov na god 1851 was published by Literaturnoe zavedenie priashevskoe and written by Alexander Dukhnovych

That same year, Dukhnovych founded a literary society called the Literaturnoe zavedenie priashevskoe, which operated until 1853. The society aimed to unite the literary-minded Rusyn intelligentsia, establish a literary journal, create a Cyrillic printing press, and found a museum of Rusyn culture. Despite its ambitious goals, the society was dissolved by imperial decree. During its three years of existence, it managed to publish 12 Rusyn books, including two additional almanacs (Pozdravlenie Rusynov na god 1851 and 1852), a textbook (Short Geography for Rusyns), a catechism, and the prayer book Bread of the Soul also Religious Prayers and Songs of Eastern Churches and Orthodox Christians, published in 1851. This prayer book became the most popular devotional text among Rusyn believers. The Mukachevo Eparchy, however, did not support Dukhnovych's society and never purchased a single book published by it. The eparchy's pro-Hungarian orientation and its desire to maintain good relations with Hungarian intellectuals led to its lack of support for the Rusyn awakening.

In the 1860s, fears of potential Magyarization began to circulate among the Rusyn intelligentsia. In 1867, Ivan Danilovych-Korytnyansky wrote the play The Family Celebration, in which the main Rusyn protagonist initially aspires to become Hungarian but ultimately returns to his homeland (Hungarian Rus) because of love. As early as 1863, Alexander Dukhnovych had distanced himself from Magyarization. To counter such ideas, he founded a new society.

In 1862, Alexander Dukhnovych, alongside Alexander Pavlovich and with the support of the Greek Catholic Eparchy in Prešov under Bishop Jozef Gaganec, established the Society of St. John the Baptist (Общество св. Іоанна Крестителя, Obshchestvo sv. Ioana Krestitelia). Adolf Dobriansky was elected as the society's chairman, with Anton Rubiy as his deputy. The society's members included prominent Rusyn figures from Eastern Slovakia, as well as Slovak writers, journalists, and notable Russian Slavists such as Mikhail Raevsky, Vladimir Lamansky, and Georgiy Slavyansky. These Russian Slavists contributed funds and books to Dukhnovych's library, which he had donated to the Basilian monastery in Krásny Brod in 1859. This marked the creation of the first public Rusyn library. The society aimed to educate Rusyn youth to further the national awakening. It established the Alumneum student college in Prešov, where Adolf Dobriansky promoted his political programs. Additionally, the society founded a Cyrillic printing press in Uzhhorod, which was a significant milestone in the awakening. The press enabled authors to publish their works locally rather than sending them to Lviv or Trnava, where the nearest Cyrillic printing presses were located.

Despite his pivotal role, Dukhnovych opposed the creation of a Rusyn literary language based on the most widespread Rusyn dialects. Instead, he distinguished between a "low style" for spoken and folk Rusyn, and a "high style" for theoretical works. The high style combined Rusyn with Russian and could take the form of the Carpatho-Rusyn dialect of the Russian language, the Iazychie language, or standard Russian.

Dukhnovych died in 1865, after which the cultural center of the Rusyn awakening shifted from Prešov to Uzhhorod. In response to his death, the Society of St. Basil the Great (Общество св. Василія Великого, Obshchestvo sv. Vasylia Velykoho) was founded in Uzhhorod in 1866 by Adolf Dobriansky and Ioann Rakovsky. The society began publishing the first newspaper by the Rusyn intelligentsia, the weekly Svit, which was written in the Carpatho-Rusyn dialect of the Russian language. Like the Society of St. John the Baptist, it aimed to establish Rusyn schools and published textbooks in both Rusyn and Hungarian.

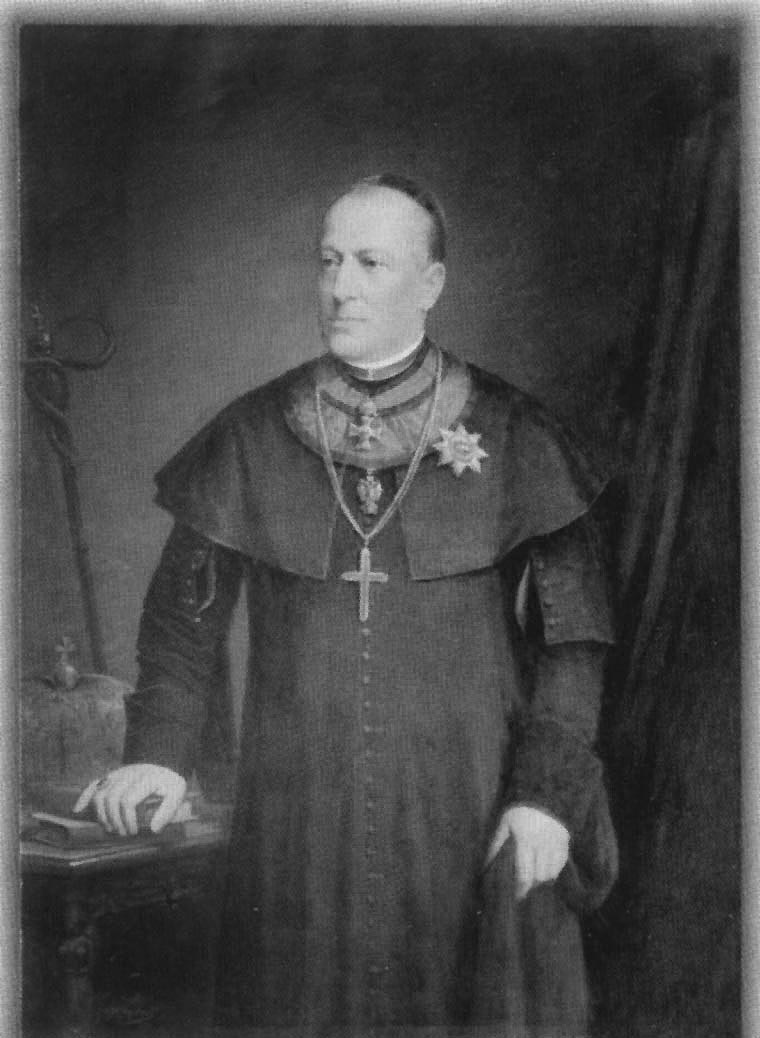
Stefan Pankovics was the most significant propagator of Magyarization between Rusyns during the awakening

=== Magyarization efforts ===
In February 1867, the Austro-Hungarian Compromise was enacted. Initially, Hungarian reforms refused to recognize any national minorities within Hungary, but they permitted the use of native or any chosen languages in administration, education, and religious life. However, these imposed reforms had no penalties for failing to use the designated languages, allowing pro-Hungarian officials to exploit the situation. For example, in 1869, teaching in the Rusyn language was banned at the Uzhhorod Gymnasium, and under Bishop Stefan Pankovics, the Mukachevo Eparchy supported the Magyarization of the Rusyns. In a heated debate with Rusynophile Ivan Silvay, Bishop Pankovics declared: "If we now live under Hungarian rule, we must become Hungarians."

In December 1870, Pankovics accused the editorial team of the Rusyn newspaper Svit of dangerous tendencies and forbade the eparchy's clergy from having any contact with them. In 1871, he orchestrated an internal coup in the Society of St. Basil the Great, removing Adolf Dobriansky and Ioann Rakovsky from leadership and replacing them with pro-Hungarian Greek Catholic clergy who did not speak a word of Rusyn. That same year, the society began publishing the weekly Novyi Svit, which in 1872 was replaced by Karpat due to the editorial team's strong Rusyn nationalism. Initially, Karpat was presented as a social, ecclesiastical, and literary newspaper. Rusyn intellectuals were involved in its early stages, but as pro-Hungarian tendencies increased, they distanced themselves from it. Stefan Pankovics continued his campaign of Magyarization within his eparchy. He banned sending Rusyn seminarians to schools in Vienna to prevent exposure to the so-called "Slavic influences" and promoted forced emigration of anti-Hungarian Rusyns to central Hungary or Russia. Among those forced into exile were Russophiles such as Viktor Kimak and others, who emigrated to Russia.

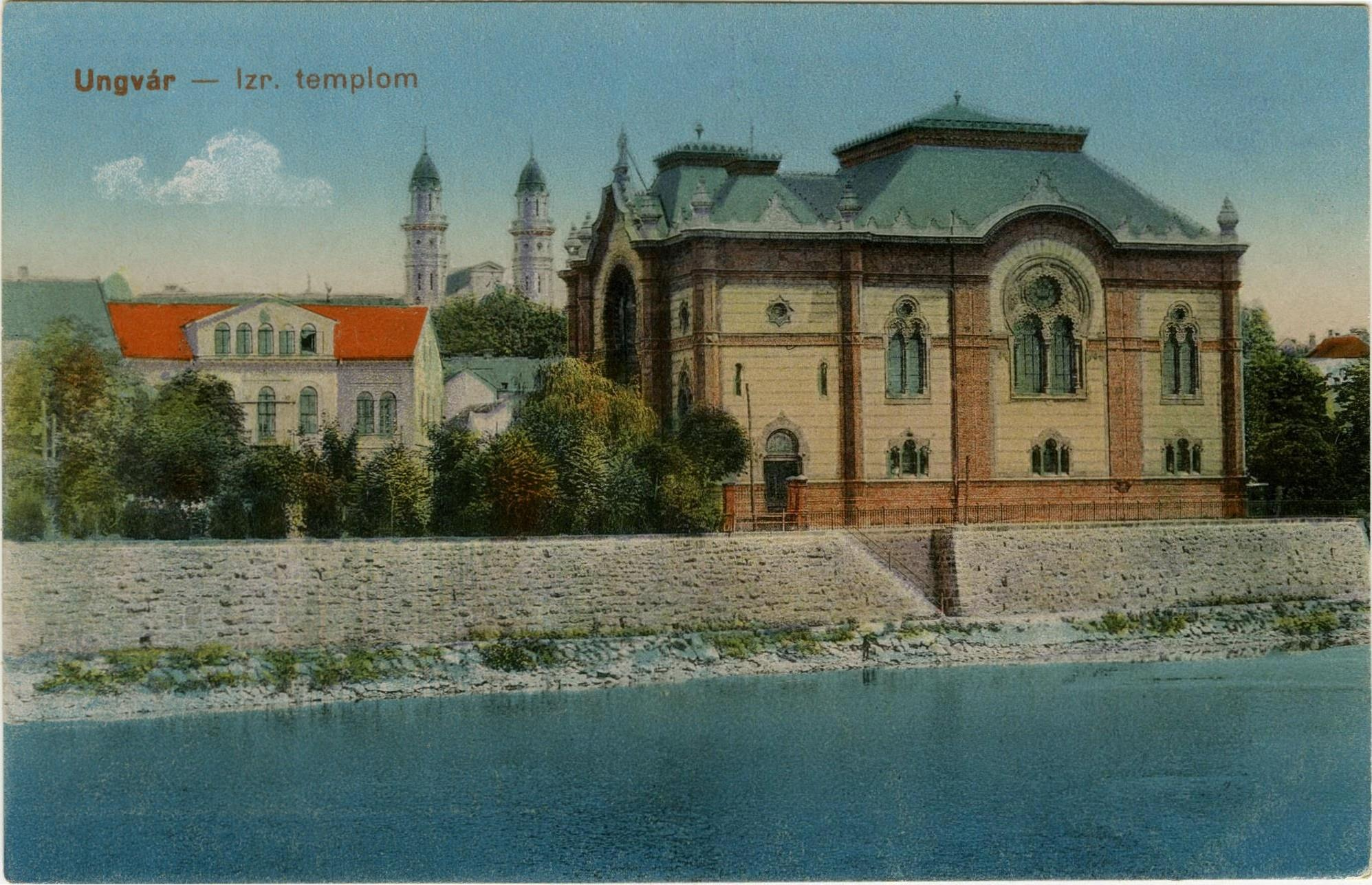
Uzhhorod, one of the cultural centers of awakening. In the photo, you can see the Great Synagogue and the bell towers of the Greek Catholic Cathedral

In 1873, the Society of St. Basil the Great held its eighth and final meeting, heavily influenced by Pankovics, during which it decided to publish Rusyn books exclusively in Hungarian. This decision effectively ended the society's activities, and it published no further works. Opposition to Pankovics's policies was minimal. Key opponents included Viktor Kimak and Kirill Sabov, who published the satirical weekly Sova. This publication criticized the Hungarian government, Bishop Pankovics, and the Catholicization of Hungary. However, after six issues, the weekly was forced to shut down, and its editorial team was exiled.

Adolf Dobriansky also opposed Pankovics and was re-elected to the Hungarian Parliament. However, during his first session, he was accused of Pan-Slavist activities, stripped of his mandate, and began drafting a new memorandum proposing the creation of a so-called Austrian Rus. This territory would combine Hungarian Rus with Galicia, a proposal nearly identical to one he had presented to the emperor in January 1849. The memorandum sparked significant criticism in Hungarian political circles, and in 1871, an unsuccessful assassination attempt was made on Dobriansky in Uzhhorod. His son, Miroslav, was seriously injured in the attack. Following the incident, Dobriansky withdrew to his estate in Čertižné and, in 1875, moved to St. Petersburg. He returned to Lviv in 1881, where he was imprisoned and, along with his daughter Olga Grabar and other Galician Russophiles, brought to trial on charges of treason. Dobriansky was acquitted and subsequently moved to Innsbruck, where he died in 1903. Adolf Dobriansky's work at the time criticized the structure of Austria-Hungary, supported the unification of the Rusyns with the Russian Empire, and opposed the Ukrainian national revival in Galicia. After 1875, Dobriansky ceased to maintain connections with the local Rusyn intelligentsia.

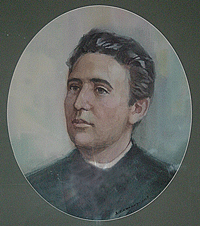
Yuli Stavrovsky-Popradov was one of the most significant Rusyn poets during the awakening. Julius believed, that the creation of Rusyn literary lanuguage should be the goal of the awakening. He had close relations with ukrainian awakener Volodymyr Hnatiuk

=== Magyarons and Rusynophiles ===
Between 1881 and 1883, the Rusyn intelligentsia split into two camps. The first camp, composed of Russophiles, included the older generation of Rusyn intellectuals such as Alexander Pavlovich, Alexander Mytrak, Yuli Stavrovsky-Popradov, and Ioann Rakovsky. This older generation supported Russia and Russophilism, writing primarily in Russian. (Note: The awakeners themselves referred to the language they wrote in as Russian, but it was more accurately a Carpatho-Rusyn dialect of Russian (Russian with some Rusyn words).) The second camp, Rusynophiles, was formed by the younger generation, including Nikolai Homichkov, Feodosii Zlotsky, and Laszlo Csopey. This younger generation wrote exclusively in the Rusyn language, realizing that common people only understood Rusyn, and they tried to cultivate it.

Laszlo Csopey published textbooks for Rusyn schools in the Rusyn language and produced the first Rusyn dictionary, featuring 20,000 words. It was a Rusyn-Hungarian dictionary, and in the introduction, Csopey argued that the Rusyn language could not be regarded merely as a dialect of Russian. This work earned him an award from the Hungarian Academy of Sciences. However, Russophiles criticized Csopey's work. The dictionary was written in Csopey's regional Uzh dialect, which contained numerous Hungarian loanwords, leading Russophiles to perceive his Rusyn language as a stepping stone toward Magyarization. Feodosii Zlotsky published A Practical Grammar of the Carpatho-Rusyn Language, while Nikolai Homichkov, editor of the weekly Karpat, decided to write the publication in a Rusyn dialect.

The poet Yuli Stavrovsky-Popradov supported the young Rusynophiles despite being a Russophile himself. He advocated for the idea of a Rusyn literary language, stating: "At least the young people among us should not belong to any party (camp) nor participate in the controversies caused of the older people (older generation, Russophiles). The duty of young people is not only to love their own nation and whithin their capabilties to contribute to its well-being... Arise, then, brothers and friends, to this holy task, to the defence and preservation of the nationality."

Alexander Mytrak also published a Russian-Hungarian dictionary, written in literary Russian, which he had to print at his own expense. This dictionary contained only a few Rusyn dialectisms and was used by leading Rusyn writers such as Julius Stavrovský-Popradov, Ivan Silvay, Anatolii Kralitsky, and Ioann Dulishkovich. The latter, Ioann Dulishkovich, authored a three-volume historiographical work titled The History of the Carpatho-Rusyns.

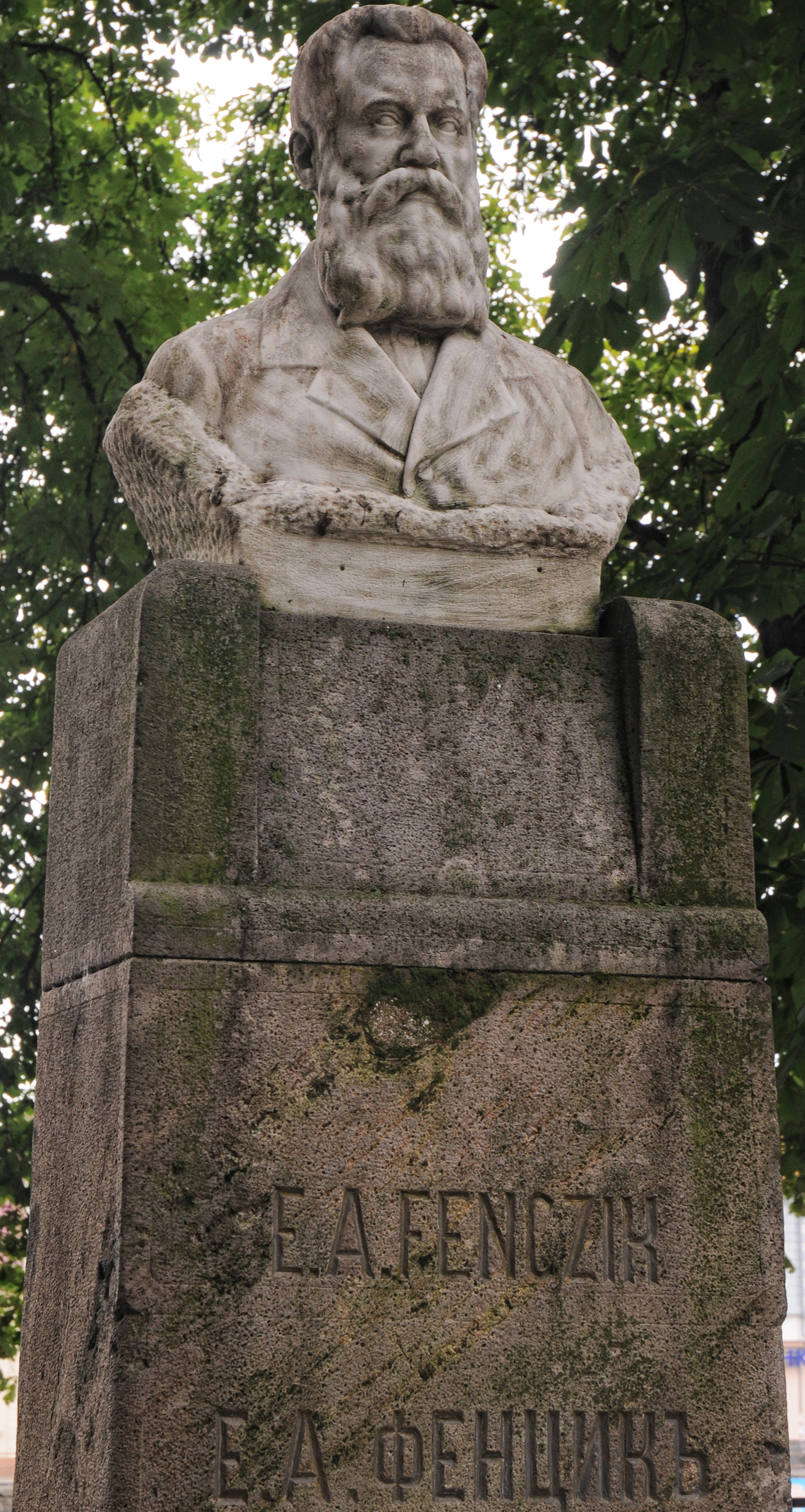
Bust of Eugeniy Fentsik in Uzhhorod. Eugeniy Fentsik was one of the last awakeners of the Russophile moment, he published the newspaper Lystok and a Dodatok

One of the last Rusyn national awakeners was Eugeniy Fentsik, a Russophile writer and journalist. In 1885, he began publishing the newspaper Lystok and, from 1891, a Dodatok entirely in Rusyn, unlike the main paper, which was in Russian. The decline of Rusyn cultural society is evident from the fact that, in its final year, the newspaper had only 25 subscribers. In addition to Fentsik, a group of Hungarian-oriented Rusyn intellectuals, the so-called Magyarons, published their own newspaper. This group, which included Yuli Drohobetskyi, Konstantin Nevitsky, Aladar Romanets, and Emil Mellesh, produced the weekly Kelet, written in Hungarian. The newspaper promoted the formation of a Hungarian political nation and proclaimed the inevitable assimilation of Rusyns into Hungarian society. Rusyn patriots such as Yuri Žatkovič, Avgustin Voloshyn, Hiiador Strypsky, Nikolai Khoma, and Yevmeniy Sabov distanced themselves from the publication, defending the Rusyn nation, its language, and its national identity.

In 1895, the Society of St. Basil the Great in Uzhhorod was reactivated. Its new leadership distanced itself from the original Russophile orientation, focusing instead on protecting Rusyn national identity.

One of the older members of the new Rusynophile movement was Yevmeniy Sabov. In 1890, he wrote a Rusyn-Hungarian Grammar. While it did not represent a purely literary Rusyn language, it was a proposal for a new Carpatho-Rusyn dialect of Russian, this time with a greater Rusyn vocabulary drawn from his native dialect. In the 1890s, two educational works were published: Bukvar' by Mikhail Vrabel and a Methodical Grammar of the Hungarian-Rusyn Literary Language by Avgustin Voloshyn. The Rusynophiles also fostered better relations with the Ukrainian national revival in Galicia. Figures such as Yuri Žatkovič and Hiiador Strypsky maintained contact with Ukrainian literary societies and even opened the first joint reading room in the village of Skotarske. Although individuals like Žatkovič and Strypsky collaborated with Ukrainian literary societies, most of the Rusyn intelligentsia were not ready to unite with the Ukrainian revival. Avgustin Voloshyn, the future president of Carpatho-Ukraine, remarked: "Those terrible diseases of Ukrainianism and radicalism, that have recently spread to Galicia, have brought about continual strife and have alienated the Rusyn from his church, his language, and even from his name."

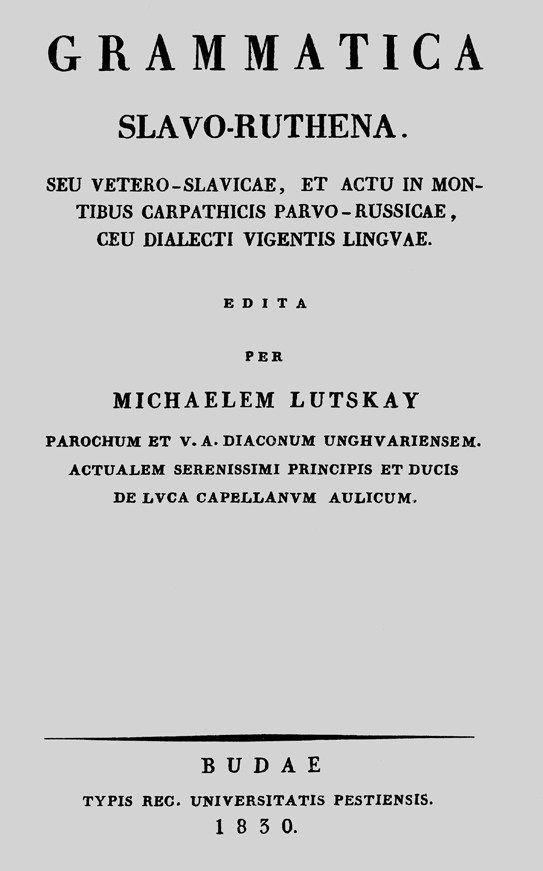
Grammatica Slavo-Ruthena is a linguistic book written in Latin. Author Mikhail Luchkay believed that this is the first official Rusyn grammar, though it more accurately describes the grammar of the artificial language Iazychie

== Rusyn literary language ==
The first linguist was Arsenii Kotsak, who wrote five textbooks on the grammar of Church Slavonic. Arsenii considered his work, Slavenorussian grammar, to be the first Rusyn grammar; however, it was not written in the Rusyn language but in Church Slavonic with Rusyn elements. In the 1830s, Mikhail Luchkay authored Grammatica Slavo-Ruthena and a Rusyn-Latin-Hungarian-German Dictionary. Luchkay also regarded Grammatica Slavo-Ruthena as a Rusyn grammar, though it more accurately describes the grammar of the artificial language Iazychie.

The first artificial language considered literary by revivalists was Iazychie. This constructed language combined elements of Church Slavonic, Russian, and Rusyn. It emerged during Mikhail Luchkay's lifetime and gained popularity after the Hungarian Revolution. Alexander Dukhnovych did not support the development of a Rusyn literary language based on the most widespread Rusyn dialects. Instead, he divided the contemporary Rusyn language into a "low style," representing the spoken, original Rusyn for literary works, and a "high style," which combined Rusyn and Russian for theoretical writings. The high style included either a Carpatho-Rusyn dialect of the Russian language, the language Iazychie, or the Russian language itself.

The second language regarded as literary was Russian, though it was not standard Russian but rather a Carpatho-Rusyn dialect of Russian with Rusyn features. Figures such as Alexander Mytrak, Yuli Stavrovsky-Popradov, and Ioann Rakovsky used this form of Russian. It served as an alternative to the older Iazychie, which had been preferred by the older generation of revivalists, including Alexander Dukhnovich, Nikolai Nagy, and Mikhail Luchkay. A significant milestone in the Russophile direction was Alexander Mytrak's Rusyn-Hungarian Dictionary, which was used by leading Rusyn writers like Yuli Stavrovsky-Popradov and Anatolii Kralicky.

After the first dissolution of the Society of St. Basil the Great, the idea of a new literary language reemerged. Russophiles advocated for using Russian as the literary language of the Rusyns, while Rusynophiles supported the creation of a new literary language based on Rusyn dialects.

In 1889, the Magyaron journal Kelet undertook an initiative to identify a suitable dialect for the formation of a Rusyn literary language. On June 16, 1889, it published an article titled Request, in which it called upon educated inhabitants of Rusyn villages to translate two Hungarian texts and submit a local folk song.

The goal of this initiative was to collect as much linguistic material as possible from across Rusyn dialects, thereby facilitating the editors efforts in developing a standardized literary language. According to the journal's editor, Iosyf Festorii, the most suitable dialect was identified as the spoken language of the Rusyn population in the Máramaros County.

In 1890, Yevmeniy Sabov wrote Rusyn-Hungarian Grammar. It was not a purely literary Rusyn language but rather a proposal for a new Carpatho-Rusyn dialect of Russian, this time incorporating a larger Rusyn vocabulary drawn from his native Rusyn dialect.

Sabov's predecessors, Laszlo Csopey and Feodosii Zlotsky, attempted to create a purely Rusyn language. Although these awakeners did not collaborate together on a unified language, they laid the foundations for a potential Rusyn literary language. Laszlo Csopey's proposal was based on the Uzh dialect, which contained Hungarianisms. His approach was unpopular among Russophiles, who saw it as a step toward the Magyarization of the Rusyns.

A Rusyn literary, or standard language to be used by future generations, was not created during the national awakening. The beginnings of a possible standardization and codification of a Rusyn literary language only emerged in Czechoslovakia in the 20th century. Gregory Žatkovič addressed this issue in his 1923 work The National Question of the Rusyns. However, to this day, a unified Rusyn language has not been established.

== Rusyn awakeners ==
- Andriy Bachynskyi (1732–1809)
- Yevgeny Bachynskyi (1845–1903)
- Ioannikii Bazilovich (1742–1821)
- Laszlo Csopey (1856–1934)
- Ivan Churhovich (1791–1862)
- Yuli Drohobetskyi (?–?)
- Ioann Dulishkovich (1815–1883)
- Ivan Danilovych-Korytnyansky (1834–1895)
- Adolf Dobriansky (1817–1901)
- Viktor Dobriansky (1816–1860)
- Alexander Dukhnovych (1789–1843)
- Eugeniy Fentsik (1844–1903)
- Joann Fogarashi-Berezhanin (1786–1834)
- Jozef Gaganec (1793–1875)
- Viktor Gebey (1838–1896)
- Jakov Holovatskyi (1814–1888)
- Alexander Homichkov (1830–1892)
- Nikolai Homichkov (1833–1886)
- Yuriy Ignatkov (?–?)
- Nikolai Khoma (?–?)
- Viktor Kimak (1840–1900)
- Arsenii Kotsak (1737–1800)
- Anatolii Kralitsky (1835–1894)
- Ioann Kutka (1750–1812)
- Mikhail Luchkay (1789–1843)
- Emil Mellesh (?–?)
- Ioann Mondok (1824–1886)
- Alexandr Mytrak (1837–1913)
- Nikolai Nagy (1819–1862)
- Konstantin Nevicky (?–?)
- Ivan Orlai (1770–1829)
- Ioann Pasteliy (1741–1799)
- Alexander Pavlovich (1819–1900)
- Ioann Rakovsky (1815–1885)
- Andrej Ripay (1829–1914)
- Aladar Romanets (?–?)
- Anton Rubiy (1831–?)
- Kirill Sabov (1838–1914)
- Yevmeniy Sabov (1859–1934)
- Ivan Silvay (1838–1904)
- Yuli Stavrovsky-Popradov (1850–1899)
- Hiiador Strypsky (1875–1946)
- Jozef Sholtes (1813–1869)
- Yuri Venelin (1802–1839)
- Mikhail Visianik (1792–1873)
- Avgustyn Voloshyn (1874–1945)
- Mikhail Vrabel (1866–1923)
- Alexander Yanitsky (?–?)
- Feodosii Zlotsky (1846–1926)
- Yuri Žatkovič (1855–1920)

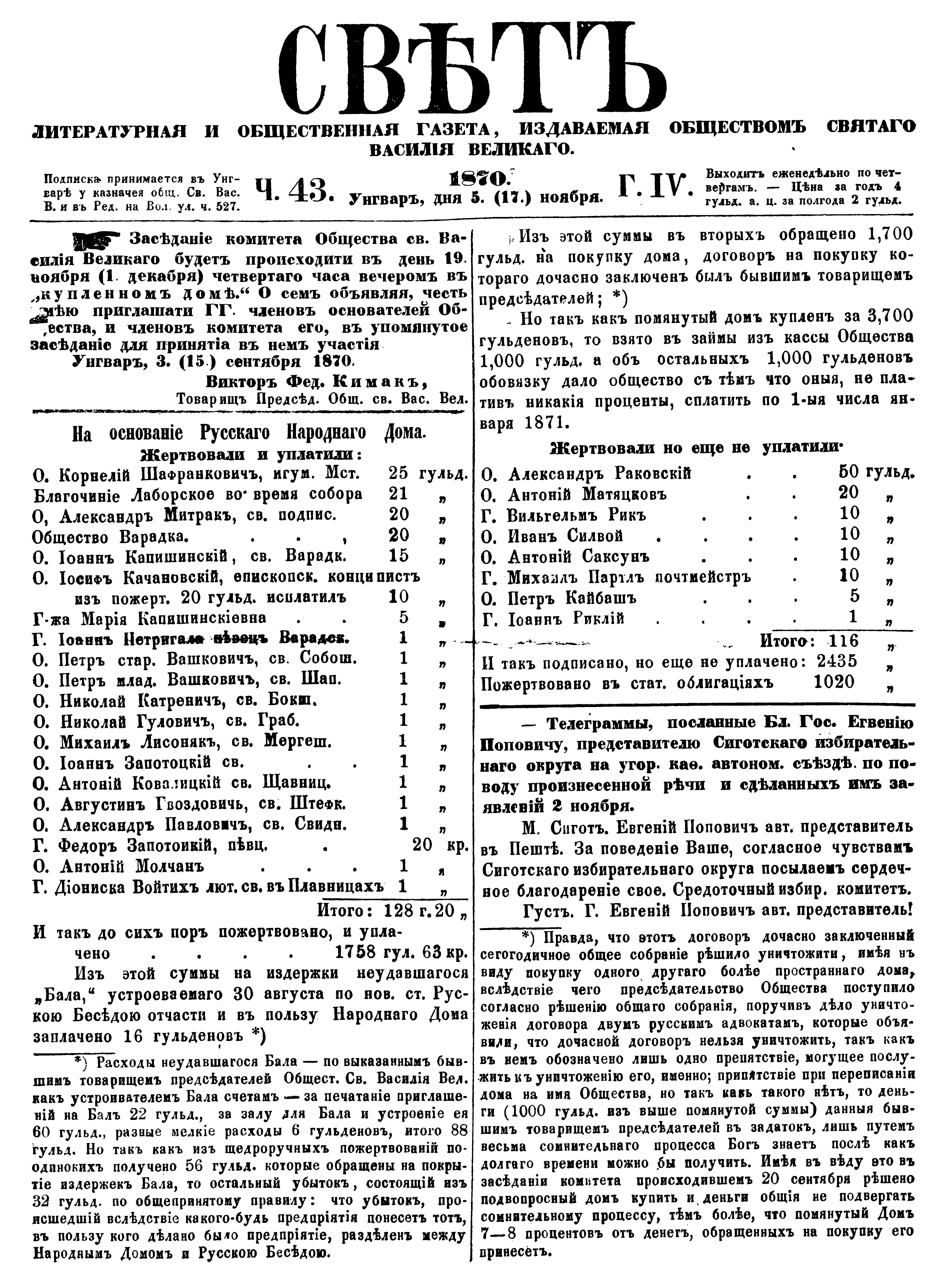
Front page of the weekly newspaper Svit published by the Society of St. Basil the Great

== Journals and newspapers ==
=== Vistnyk ===
Vistnyk (Rusyn: Вістник) was the first Rusyn journal, published in Vienna in 1850. The editor of the journal was Alexander Dukhnovych, along with Galician revivalists residing in Vienna. Alexander Dukhnovych wrote about the position of Rusyns within the Kingdom of Hungary. The magazine was Slavophile in nature and was later renamed The Political Magazine for the Rusyns of the Austrian Lands.

=== Zemskyi pravytel'stvennyi chasopis dle korolestva Uharskaho ===
Zemskyi pravytel'stvennyi chasopis dle korolestva Uharskaho (Iazychie: Земскій правительственный часописъ длѣ королевства Угорскаго) was the second Rusyn journal, published in Budapest in 1850. This magazine was written solely by Ioann Rakovsky, who spent most of his life in Budapest and supported the revival through his work in newspapers and journals.

=== Tserkovnaya gazeta ===
Tserkovnaya gazeta (Russian: Церковная газета) was a weekly newspaper published by Ioann Rakovsky in Budapest. In 1855, at the home of Adolf Dobriansky, together with other Rusyns, they agreed to establish the weekly. It featured articles from Russian religious magazines as well as contributions by Yakiv Holovatsky and Alexander Dukhnovych. On May 19, 1858, the publication was banned by authorities. They were permitted to release ten more issues under a different name. After those ten issues, the newspaper was permanently prohibited.

=== Svit ===
Svit (Rusyn: Свѣтъ) was the first Rusyn weekly newspaper published by the Society of St. Basil the Great. The newspaper focused on literature and society, supporting the prevailing Russophile trends of the time. It evaluated political life in Hungary and also published reviews of works by Russian writers. The first editor was Yuriy Ignatkov, followed by Kirill Sabov and Viktor Kimak.

The weekly strongly opposed Magyarization and Bishop Stefan Pankovics. It believed in the salvation of the Rusyn population through Russia, envisioning liberation from Hungarian or Austrian occupation of Rusyn territories. In 1870, the weekly began publishing Narodnoe chtenye (Russian: Народное чтение), a series of books aimed at spreading among the Rusyn population and supporting the weekly itself.

The publication ceased in early 1871, shortly after Viktor Kimak stepped down as a redactor.

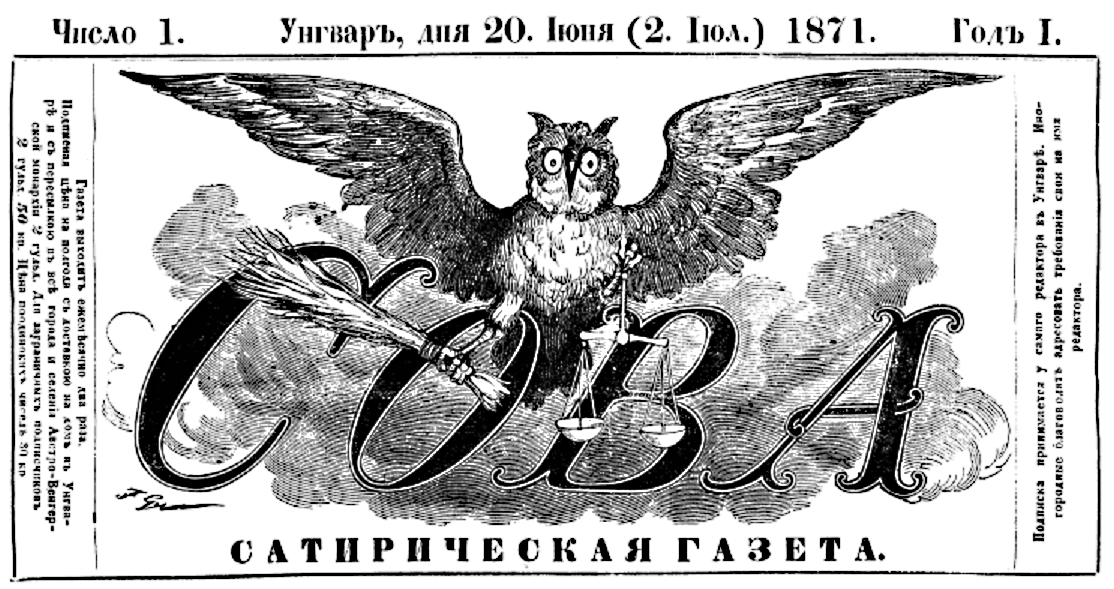
Front page of the first issue of the weekly newspaper Sova published by Viktor Kimak

=== Sova ===
Sova (Rusyn: Сова) was a Rusyn illustrated and satirical weekly newspaper published by Viktor Kimak. The newspaper was liberal-bourgeois in nature and supported the Russophile trends of the time. It opposed Magyarization and the Catholicisation of the Hungarian Rusyns. Sova was effectively the successor to Svit, with Viktor Kimak serving as its chief editor.

The first issue was printed in Uzhhorod and criticized the Hungarian government and Bishop Stefan Pankovics. Following its publication, Viktor faced persecution from the church and the government and was prohibited by the bishop from printing the weekly in Uzhhorod. The remaining four issues were printed in Budapest before the newspaper was banned.

=== Karpat ===
Karpat (Rusyn: Карпат) was a social, ecclesiastical, and literary weekly newspaper published by the Society of St. Basil the Great. It served as the successor to the discontinued weekly Svit, which was shut down under pressure from Bishop Stefan Pankovics. Initially, some Rusyn intellectuals collaborated with the weekly, but as pro-Hungarian tendencies increased in its content, they distanced themselves from it.

=== Lystok ===
Lystok (Rusyn: Листокъ) was a Russophile monthly journal published by Eugeniy Fentsik. In his publication, he wrote about the issues and developments within the Rusyn literary intelligentsia. Listok was written in Russian or Church Slavonic. After six years of publishing Lystok, he also began writing a supplement, Dodatok (Rusyn: Додатокъ), which was written in Rusyn.

=== Kelet ===
Kelet (Hungarian: Kelet) was a political weekly newspaper published by Magyarons. The main contributors to the weekly were Yuli Drohobetskyi, Konstantin Nevitsky, Aladar Romanets, and Emil Mellesh. The weekly supported Magyarization of Rusyns and the formation of new Hungarian political nation. The weekly was written in Hungarian and many Rusyn intellectuals distanced themselves from it.

In the second half of the 1880s, the weekly Kelet also published articles from the Rusynophile movement, including figures such as Yevmeniy Sabov. The journal also reported on the lives of notable Russophile leaders, such as Adolf Dobriansky and Ioann Rakovsky.

During the 1880s and 1890s, one of the highest-ranking editors was Yuri Žatkovič. Under his editorial leadership, Kelet published several dozen Rusynophile and Ukrainophile articles advocating for Rusyn traditions, the implementation of the Rusyn language in schools, and the question of a Rusyn literary language.

== Theatre ==
The first dramatic play emerged during the Rusyn Enlightenment. This was Dojnyk, Kozlyk, Syrodav (Rusyn: Дойник, Козлик, Сыродав), a school drama by Andriy Valkovskyi. The play was written and performed in Latin but contained a storyline set in a Rusyn environment. It is considered the oldest Rusyn dramatic work, written in 1807. The play was composed in the spirit of early pre-Romanticism and was first published by the Slovak awakener Pavel Jozef Šafárik. The second oldest dramatic work was the comedy Rozprava. Rusnak z Poliakom (Rusyn: Розправа. Руснакъ з Полякомъ) by an unknown author. This play was published in 1834 and, unlike Valkovskyi's works, was written in verse with syllabic versification. The plot depicts a dispute between a Pole and a Rusyn (Rusnak) over cultural and national superiority.

The beginnings of predominantly Rusyn-language theatre are attributed to Alexander Dukhnovych, who was active in the second half of the 19th century. Other notable playwrights included Ivan Danilovych-Korytnyansky, Ivan Silvay, and Eugeniy Fentsik. Theatre played a crucial role in spreading the Rusyn national awakening, with the advantage that even illiterate Rusyns could understand the performed plays.

The first and most significant theatrical play by Alexander Dukhnovych was the satirical play Dobroditel' prevyshaet bohatetvo (Rusyn: Добродѣтель превышает богатетво). Written in 1850, the play consists of three acts and was composed and performed in Rusyn. Its premiere took place in 1851 in a meadow between the villages of Topoľany and Stráňany (now districts of Michalovce) and was staged by an amateur theatre group led by Alexander Labanc. Theatre critic Mikhail Lykhvarchyk attended the premiere and later published a review in the magazine Vistnyk. The play's plot depicted the contemporary conflict between the Rusyn intelligentsia and the local bourgeoisie, which supported Magyarization.

Dukhnovych's second play was the satirical comedy Golovnyi tarabanshchik (Iazychie: Головный тарабанщик). He wrote this play in 1852 in iazychie and sent it to Lviv, seeking collaboration with Galician Russophiles and the Russian dramatic scene.

In 1867, Ivan Danilovych-Korytnyansky published the theatrical comedy Semeinoe prazdniestvo (Russian: Семейное празднество). The play, written in Russian, premiered at the Koruna Hotel in Uzhhorod. The plot revolves around a Rusyn protagonist who aspires to become a Hungarian but ultimately returns to Hungarian Rus for the sake of his love. Danilovych-Korytnyanskyi also published the play Obmanshchiki (Russian: Обманщики) in 1873 and the dramatic humor piece Machkahazi ateista (Rusyn: Мачкагазі атеїста) in 1866.

In 1879, Eugeniy Fentsik published the heroic-romantic or historically patriotic tragedy Pokorenie Uzhgoroda (Russian: Покорение Ужгорода). The plot depicts the Hungarian invasion of Europe and the defense of Uzhhorod Castle by ruler Laborec.

Rusyn theatre remained active even after the end of the national revival, reaching its peak in the 1930s in Czechoslovakia.

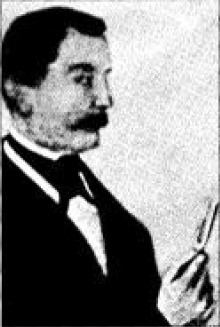
Konstantin Matezonskyi was a co-founder and conductor of the Harmonie choir. He was not Rusyn himself; he came to Uzhhorod from Przemyśl and used the pseudonym Bielorusyn (Rusyn: Бѣлорусин).

== Music ==
=== Cantus planus ===
A popular musical genre in the territory of Hungarian Rus consisted of folk songs and music, as well as religious hymns known as Cantus planus. During the Rusyn national awakening, Cantus planus was actively promoted, particularly by Greek Catholic eparchies, which used it during sermons. Around 1794, Cantus planus began to be taught at the Uzhhorod Theological Seminary, and around the same time, musician and scribe Ioann Iuhasevych-Skliarskyi published seven books on liturgical hymns. In 1834, Ivan Churhovich, in collaboration with conductor Konstantin Matezonskyi and Vasyl Dovhovych, founded the first choir in Hungarian Rus, named Harmonie.

=== Liturgical hymnals ===
Until the mid-19th century, hymn texts were known only to cantors; they later became accessible to the general faithful through printed hymnals. Among the most notable hymnals were those by Alexander Dukhnovych and Alexander Pavlovich. In 1851, Dukhnovich published the prayer book Bread of the Soul, which contained religious prayers and hymns of Eastern Churches and Orthodox Christians, becoming the most popular prayer book among Rusyn believers. In 1866, Pavlovich published The Great Hymnal, a collection of hymns for morning, evening, and Sunday liturgies as well as feast days.

Towards the end of the Rusyn revival, Mukachevo bishop Yuliy Firtsak decided to compile two books to unify the sung prayer tradition of the Mukachevo Greek Catholic Eparchy. This resulted in the Uzhhorod Hymnal, first published in 1902, containing the texts of 180 hymns compiled by Ivan Silvay.

== Visual Arts ==
Before the Rusyn national awakening, iconography and religious art were the dominant visual forms in Hungarian Rus, primarily supported by the Mukachevo Greek Catholic Eparchy. During the revival, religious artistic traditions remained prevalent, with Josef Zmii-Miklovshyk as a key representative, particularly in church art. Trained in Vienna, Zmii-Miklovshyk worked under the Bishop of Prešov, painting several iconostasis and altarpieces, the most notable being the altar in St. John the Baptist Cathedral in Prešov. He was also the first Rusyn painter to create portraits and landscapes. Since visual arts were not widely popular among the predominantly poor Rusyn population, most painters of Rusyn origin worked outside Hungarian Rus.

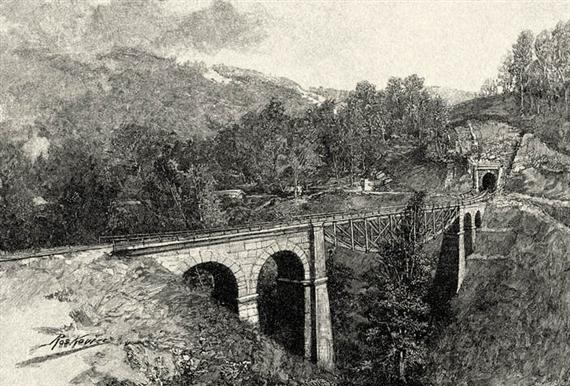
Landscape painting by Ignác Roskovics depicting a railway bridge in Uzhok

Due to limited economic opportunities and a lack of artistic institutions in Hungarian Rus, many painters pursued education and careers in larger centers such as Vienna and Budapest. The most renowned painter of Rusyn origin is considered to be Ignác Roskovics. He studied art in Vienna and Budapest, and his most significant works include frescoes in St. Stephen's Basilica in Budapest and in the Co-Cathedral of the Ascension of the Lord in Kecskemét. Roskovics also painted several religious artworks for Greek Catholic churches in present-day eastern Slovakia.

Other notable Rusyn painters included Mikhail Hrabar, Edmund Samovolskyi, Anastaz Homichkov, Ferdinand Vidra, and Ferenc Hervedle. While more painters lived and worked in Hungarian Rus, they had little impact on the wider Rusyn population.

Visual arts gained importance after World War I during the Czechoslovak period, which provided more favorable conditions for cultural and artistic development.

== See also ==
- Galician Russophilia – 19th–20th-century political movement among Ukrainians and Rusyns in Galicia
- Rusyn language – East Slavic language
- Rusyns – East Slavic ethnic group
- Ukrainian national revival – Social and political movement in Ukraine
