= History of the Jews in Carpathian Ruthenia =

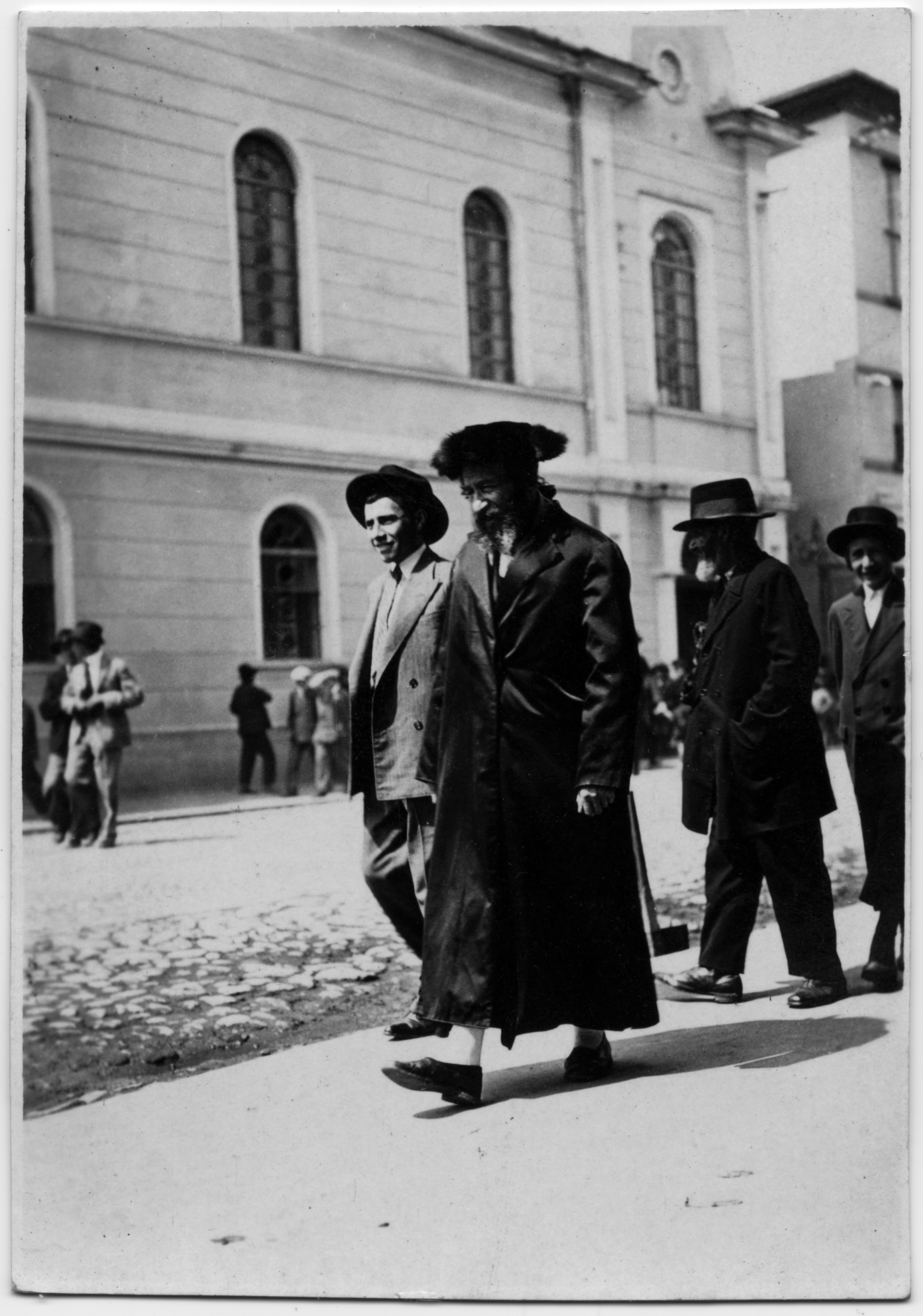
Jews of Carpathian Ruthenia, 1938

Jews settled in this small region variously called Ruthenia, Carpathian Ruthenia, Sub-Carpathian Ruthenia or simply Transcarpathia as early as the 15th century. Local rulers allowed Jewish citizens to own land and practice many trades that were precluded to them in other locations. Jews settled in the region over time and established communities that built great synagogues, schools, printing houses, businesses, and vineyards. By the end of the 19th century there were as many as 150,000 Jews living in the region.

== Haredi Judaism in Subcarpathian Ruthenia ==
Interwar Subcarpathian Ruthenia was an important centre of Haredi ("Ultra-Orthodox") Judaism, including Hasidic groups. Many outstanding rabbis lived here or found refuge from neighbouring countries, leading yeshivot (religious schools) and keeping a hatzer (court), specifically in Munkacs. These groups were often fiercely competing with each other, and with secular or liberal Jewish groups.

== Beginning of the 20th Century ==
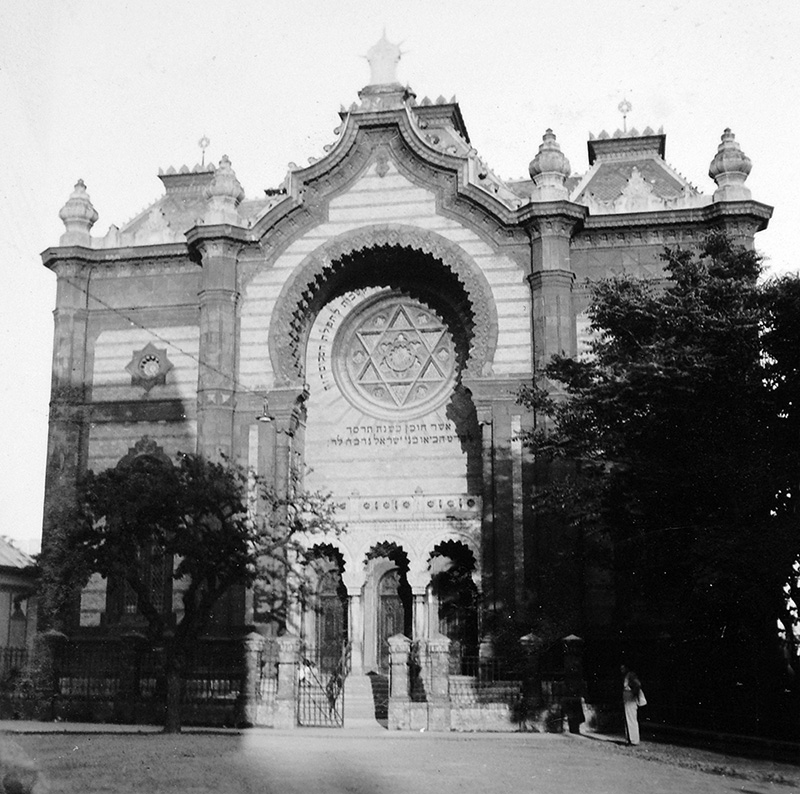
Synagogue in Ungvár (Uzhhorod), 1920

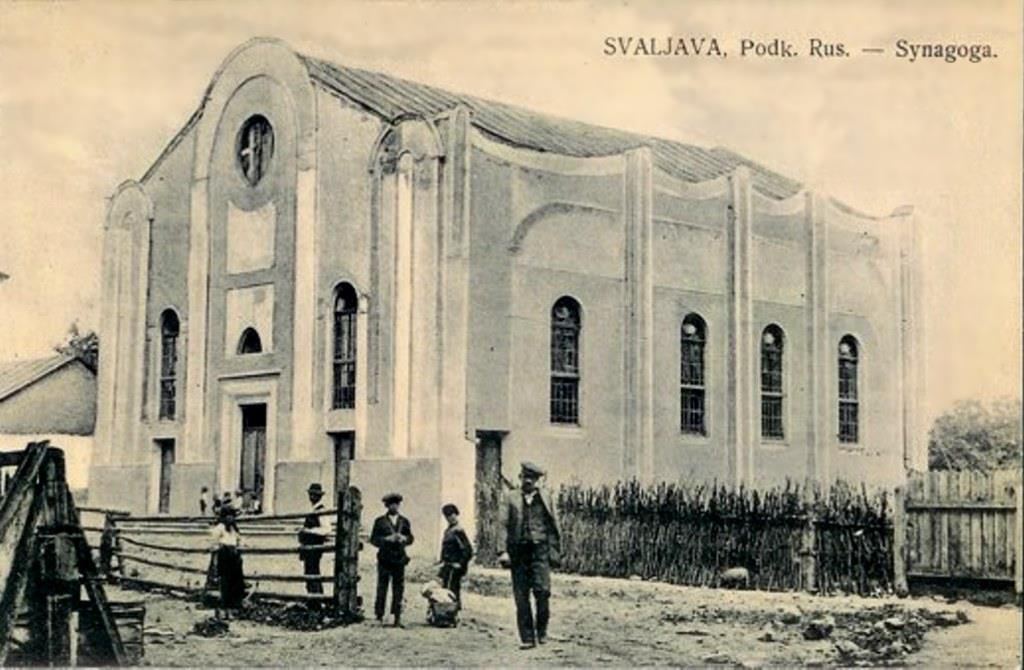
Synagogye in Svaljava (Szolyva), 1922

The last antebellum census in Hungary was in 1910. The four counties of Kingdom of Hungary that covered the territory (now known as Carpathian Ruthenia) were Ung, Bereg, Ugocsa and Máramaros.

Counties of Kingdom of Hungary, Ugocsa and Máramaros were split between Czechoslovakia and Romania in 1920 by Treaty of Trianon after the disintegration of the Austro-Hungarian Empire, which lost the World War I. In 1939, Hungary annexed back the northern parts of its former counties from the short lived Ruthenian state of Carpatho-Ukraine after the breakup of the Second Czechoslovak Republic. And in 1940, their southern parts of the former counties returned from Romania by the Second Vienna Award. After the World War II, the Soviet Union annexed the northern parts and today it belongs to Ukraine as a successor state to the Soviet Union. The southern parts were reverted to Romania after the World War II.

Counties of Kingdom of Hungary, Ung and Bereg became part of Czechoslovakia in 1920 by Treaty of Trianon, except a small part of Bereg that stayed in Hungary. The southern parts its former counties returned to Hungary from Czechoslovakia in 1938 by the First Vienna Award, and their northern parts from the short lived Ruthenian state in 1939.

County	Dec 1910	Jan 1941 total	part annexed in 1938	part annexed in 1939	part annexed in 1940
Ung	17,587 (10.9%)	20,903 (9.8%)	13,000 (lower)	8,000 (upper)	-
Bereg	33,660 (14.2%)	46,156 (12.9%)	25,000 (lower)	21,000 (upper)	-
Ugocsa	11,850 (12.9%)	10,932 (11.9%)	-	7,000 (northern)	4,000 (southern)
Máramaros	65,694 (18.4%)	79,048 (16.2%)	-	48,000 (northern)	31,000 (southern)
Total	128,791 (15.2%)	157,766 (13.7%)	38,000	84,000	35,000

== Czechoslovakia ==
In 1921, about 27% of the Jews of Subcarpathian Rus lived from agriculture, making it the highest percentage of Jewish peasantry in all of Europe. In the 1921 and 1930 censuses, 87 and 93 percent respectively of all Subcarpathian Jews considered themselves to be Jews by nationality. It was, therefore, the least assimilated, Yiddish-speaking group in Czechoslovakia.

== Jewish-local relations on the eve of World War II ==
Memoirs and historical studies provide much evidence that in the 19th and early 20th centuries Rusyn-Jewish relations were generally peaceful and harmonious. In 1939, census records showed that 80,000 Jews lived in the autonomous province of Ruthenia.

The attitude of some Ruthenians to their Jewish neighbors is vividly represented in the play by Alexander Dukhnovych (1803–1865), Virtue is More Important than Riches briefed here as well as in short-story triptych Golet v údolí by Ivan Olbracht. In contrast to other areas of Ukraine, Ruthenia never experienced chaotic riots and pogroms.

== The Holocaust ==
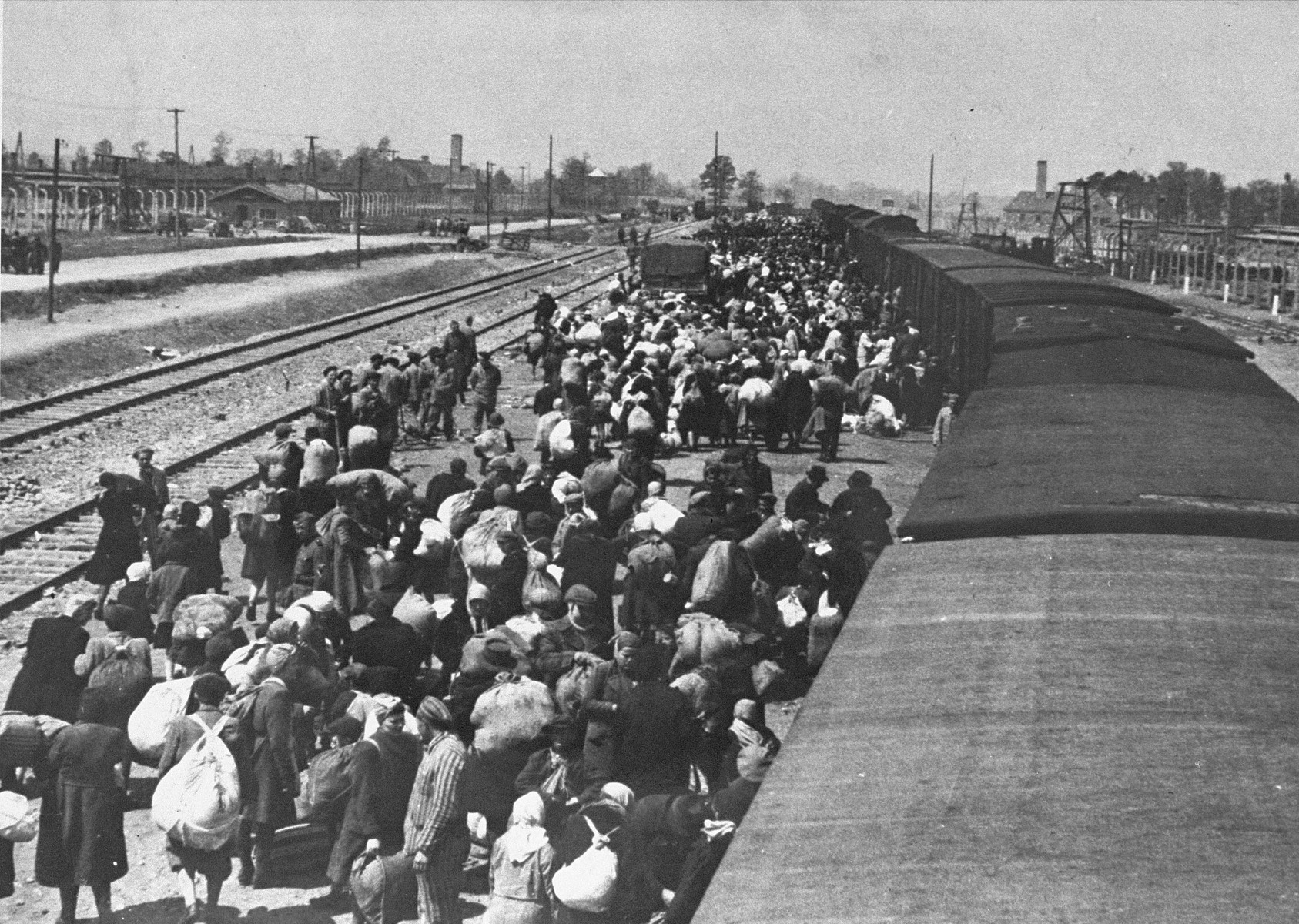
Jews from Carpathian Ruthenia arrive at Auschwitz-Birkenau, May 1944

During World War II, once the legal government of Hungary was overthrown by the Germans, the "Final Solution" of the Holocaust was also extended to Carpathian Ruthenia. To be sure, the legal government of Hungary and its fascist elements had already played a prominent role in killing Jews even before this.

Beginning in 1939, draconian laws had been passed banning Jews from going to school or from operating their previous businesses. Then in the summer of 1941, Hungarian authorities deported about 18,000 Jews from Carpathian Ruthenia to the Galician region of Poland-Ukraine. This was done under the guise of expelling alien refugees, but in practice most of those expelled were from families that had lived in the region for the previous 50–100 years. Many who might have been able to prove their long-term residency were taken without being given the chance. Most of the deportees were immediately handed over to Nazi German Einsatzgruppen units at Kaminets Podolsk and machine-gunned over a three-day period in late 1941. A few thousand others were simply left to their own devices after being pushed across the border into Galicia, in the area near Kaminets Podolsk. The vast majority of this group subsequently perished over the next two years in ghettos and death camps with other Jewish residents of the region.

Those Jews fortunate enough to avoid the 1941 deportations faced further privations under Hungarian rule. Men of working age were conscripted into slave labor gangs in which a high proportion perished. The remnant were ultimately returned to their homes in time to suffer deportation to concentration camps under Nazi rule after 1944.

In April 1944, 17 main ghettos were set up in cities in Ruthenia. 144,000 Jews were rounded up and held there. Starting on May 15, 1944: 14,000 Jews were taken out of these sites to Auschwitz every day until the last deportation on June 7, 1944.

The following table shows the death trains originating from these four counties that went through Kassa (Košice). (Some Jewish males were on forced labor (munkaszolgálat); some trains did not pass through Kassa; and some Jews from the area were forced to board trains departing from neighboring counties):

Origin of death train	# of trains	Total # of people	Date of handover from Hungarians to Germans in Kassa
Ungvár (Uzhhorod)	5	16,188	May 17, 22, 25, 27, 31
Beregszász (Berehove)	4	10,849	May 16, 18, 24, 29,
Munkács (Mukachevo)	9	28,587	May 14, 16, 17, 18, 19, 20, 21, 23, 24
Nagyszőlős (Vynohradiv)	3	9,840	May 20, 27, June 3
Ökörmező (Mizhhir'ya)	1	3,052	May 17
Huszt (Khust)	4	10,825	May 24, 26, June 2, 6
Técső (Tiachiv)	1	2,208	May 28,
Aknaszlatina (Solotvyno)	1	3,317	May 25
Máramarossziget (Sighetu Marmaţiei)	4	12,849	May 16, 18, 20, 22
Felsővisó (Vişeu de Sus)	4	12,074	May 19, 21, 23, 25
Total	36	109,789	

By June 1944, nearly 62.5% of all the Jews from ghettos of Carpathian Ruthenia had been exterminated, together with other Hungarian Jews. Of more than 144,000 Jews from Carpathian Ruthenia, of which 110,000 were deported, around 90,000 were murdered (just 20,000 deportees have survived). Except for those who managed to flee, only a small number of Jews were saved by Rusyns who hid them.

Since the fall of Communism, archives have been opened to allow study of the facts about the implementation of the Final Solution in the province. The most discussed issue is whether, and to what extent, local collaborators helped the Nazis in performing the tasks and to what extent such collaboration was forced upon those collaborators by the threat—or actuality—of brutal violence against themselves.

== Post World War II ==
The estimated number of surviving Jews from the area was 45,000–54,000 people. Most of them left Carpatho-Ruthenia before the new Soviet borders were sealed in the fall of 1945, so there were only 4,000 Jews left in 1948. At the time of the first post-World War II census in the Soviet Union, in 1959, the number of Jews in the Zakarpattia Oblast was 12,569 - most of which were immigrants from other parts of the Soviet Union.

Most Jews who remained in the region emigrated to the United States and Israel during the 1970s in the wake of the Jackson–Vanik amendment, while a few went to Hungary. The last Soviet census in 1989 found only 2,700 Jews living in the area. In the 1990s the remaining Hasidic population of Mukachevo had left.

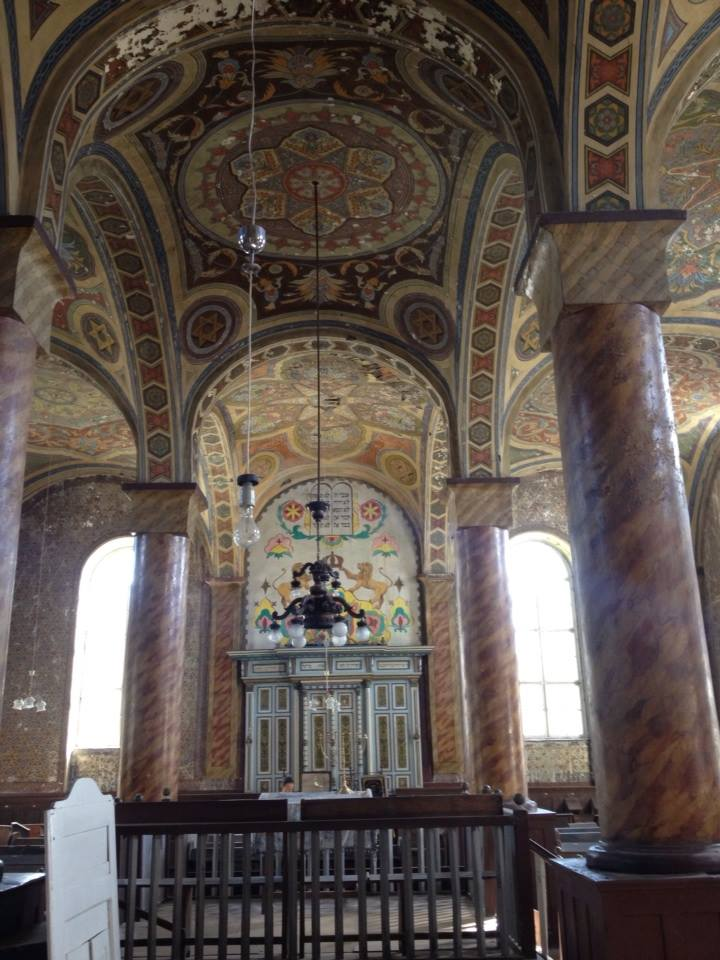
Interior of the Khust Synagogue

Today some synagogues have survived. The following cities have synagogues that existed prior to World War II:

- Khust
- Uzhhorod
- Mukachevo

== See also ==
- History of the Jews in Belarus
- History of the Jews in Hungary
- History of the Jews in Russia and the Soviet Union
- History of the Jews in Ukraine
- Oberlander Jews
- History of the Jews in Slovakia
- History of the Jews in the Czech Republic
- List of Jews from Russia, Ukraine and Belarus
