= Viktor Kimak =

Pedagogue, journalist, cultural activist

- Виктор Кимак
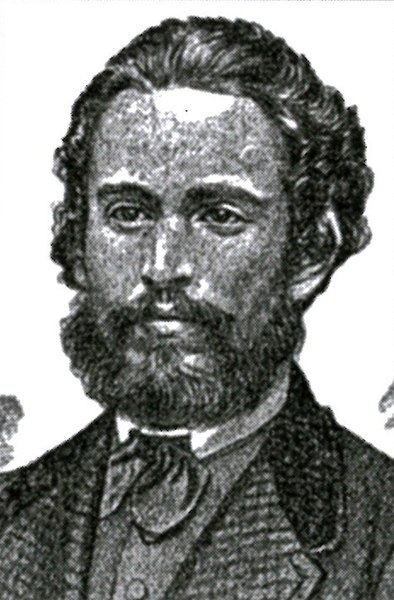
- Born: 1840; Austrian Empire
- Died: 1900 (aged 59–60); Odessa, Russian Empire (now Odesa, Ukraine)
- Occupations: journalist, teacher, historian and social activist

Viktor Kimak (Rusyn: Виктор Кимак, Russian: Виктор Кимак, 1840 – 1900) was a Rusyn journalist, pedagogue, historian and Rusyn national awakener of Russophile orientation. Kimak was one of the most influential Russophile journalists during Rusyn national awakening and served as lead editor in Svit and Sova newspapers.

Viktor Kimak was selected as the new lead editor of the weekly Svit. He continued the tradition of an anti-Hungarian stance set by former editors Yuriy Ignatkov and Kirill Sabov. The weekly was written in standard Russian and also published works by Russian authors. After Stefan Pankovics and the entire Mukachevo eparchy initiated a boycott of the weekly, the number of subscribers dropped from 500 to 160. At an internal meeting of the Society of St. Basil the Great, editorial board member Nikolai Homichkov demanded Kimak's removal from the editorial team. A vote was held, and Kimak was dismissed from his position as lead editor of the weekly.

Due to his Russophile beliefs, he was forced to teach at a gymnasium in Pécs during the period of Magyarization. In 1874, he decided to emigrate to Russian Empire, where he found teaching positions at gymnasiums in Saint Petersburg and Moscow. He later moved to Odesa, where he taught at a local gymnasium until his death.

== See also ==
- Russophilia – Admiration and fondness of Russia
- Rusyn national awakening – National revival in the Austro-Hungarian empire
- Rusyns – East Slavic ethnic group
