= Alexander Dukhnovych Theater =

Coordinates: 48.9978°N 21.2379°E

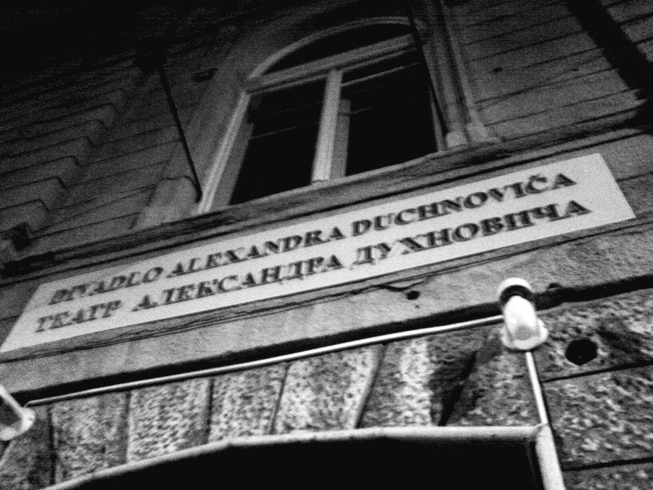
The Alexander Duchnovič Theatre

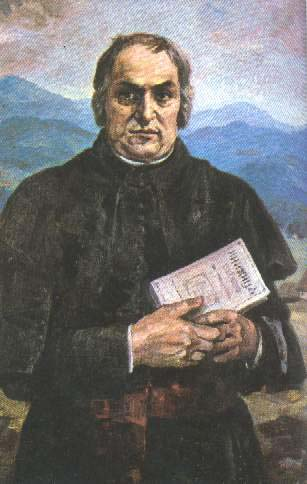
Alexander Duchnovič

The Alexander Dukhnovych Theater (Rusyn: Tеатр Александра Духновіча, Teatr Aleksandra Duxnoviča, although the sign in the adjacent photo reads Tеатр Александра Духновича; Slovak: Divadlo Alexandra Duchnoviča), located in Prešov, is the only Slovak theatre providing plays in the Rusyn language.

== History ==
The Alexander Dukhnovych Theater was founded in 1945 as a Ukrainian national Theatre. In 1990 after Velvet revolution and fall of communism in Czechoslovakia it was renamed after a priest and social activist of the Rusyn nation Alexander Dukhnovych.

== See also ==
- Rusyns
- Paul Robert Magocsi
