= Magyaron =

Magyaron, also Magyarons (Ukrainian: Мадярони, Belarusian: Мадзяроны, Slovak: Maďarón, Russian: Мадяроны, Rusyn: Мадяроны, Polish: Madziaroni), is the name of a Transcarpathian ethno-cultural group, which has an openly Hungarian orientation. They renounced their native language, culture and religion and promoted Magyarization of the Rusyn and Ukrainian population. The Magyarons did not embrace the Ukrainian identity of the Ruthenians in Carpathian Ruthenia but maintained their separate Rusyn identity. From 1920 to 1940, the group promoted the idea of rejoining Subcarpathian Rus' to Hungary, where about 185 000 ethnic Hungarians lived at the time.

== History ==
The term "Magyaron" and "Magyaronian", was used as a political pejorative term for pro-Hungarians, associated with national betrayal or treason, originated in the 19th century and in the first half of the 20th century in Ruthenian environments and was used to describe magyarized Ruthenians, loyal to the Hungarian state.

Magyarization conducted by Hungarian authorities were a principal factor in the emergence of the Magyarons, but the Ruthenians were historically pro-Hungarian and sided with Rákóczi in Rákóczi's War of Independence. In fact, Ruthenians enjoyed collective privileges in the kingdom by law, which the Hungarians refused to abolish even against the wishes of Vienna. In Hungarian society, the knowledge of German, Latin, or Hungarian (or in some regions Croatian) was a criterion to obtain education, occupy a high position and enjoy career advancement, or simply have means of subsistence.

In time of Ukrainian Revolution, the Magyarons conducted activities against the accession of Transcarpathia to West Ukrainian People's Republic.

During World War II, Magyarons worked closely with the Hungarian government, attacked the Sichovyks (soldiers of Carpathian Sich) and participated in torture and shootings of them.

Pro-Hungarian sentiment ended after the Czechoslovak government imposed Slovakization on the people.

== Hungarian-Rusyn People's Council ==
On November 9, 1918, in Ungvár (now Uzhhorod, Ukraine), the "Hungarian-Rusyn People's Council" was formed by the Magyarons, headed by the canon of the Greek Catholic Eparchy of Munkács, Simeon Sabov (1863–1929). The Hungarian-Rusyn People's Council adopted the "Memorandum", which stated that the Hungarian-Rusyn people would join their homeland, Hungary, and advocated for the integrity of its territory.

The main pro-Hungarian party in Transcarpathia was the Autonomous Agrarian Union (Hungarian: Kárpátaljai Földműves Szövetség), founded in 1924 by Ivan Fedorovich Kurtyak. This party was called "Kurtyakiv", and its followers were called kurtyakivtsi. It fought for autonomy and nurtured the Carpathian Ruthenian-Hungarian alliance and relations with Hungary.

The KFSZ bombarded the government in Prague to give land to the people of Transcarpathia and defended the interests of the Ruthenian and Hungarian peasantry during the land reform. The self-determinism of Transcarpathia was also emphasised in the Hungarian press. Its leader, who was also the first prime minister of Transcarpathia (Podkarpatská Rus) Andry Brody (Bródy András) was imprisoned by the Czechoslovak authorities in Pankrác. Brody believed that minority nations could be part of the unified Hungarian nation-body (nemzettest). In 1939 Hungary regained some of the territory, after which crowds protested for his release. He arrived back in Uzhhorod (originally Ungvár) on the 5th of March, where thousands of Hungarians and Ruthenians were waiting for his arrival. They welcomed him with these words: "Welcome to our beautiful Hungary. Long live Bródy, long live the Hungarian-Ruthenian brotherhood!"

== See also ==
- Hungarians in Slovakia
- Little Russian identity
- Bródy András
- Tisza Autonomy
- Greater Hungary
- Magyarization
- Slovakization

== Sources ==
- Довідник з історії України
