= Alexander Dukhnovych =

Transcarpathian Ruthenian priest, poet, writer, pedagogue and social activist

Aleksander Dukhnovych
- Александер Духновіч
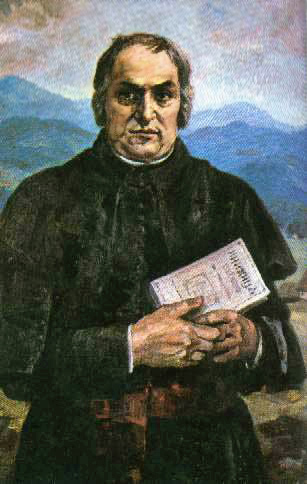
- Born: 24 April 1803; Topolya, Kingdom of Hungary (now Topoľa, Slovakia)
- Died: 30 March 1865 (aged 61); Eperies, Kingdom of Hungary, Austrian Empire (now Prešov, Slovakia)
- Occupations: Priest, poet, writer, pedagogue, and social activist

Alexander Vasilyevich Dukhnovych (Note: Rusyn: Александер Васильєвич Духновіч, romanized: Aleksander Vasylievych Dukhnovich; Ukrainian: Олександр Васильович Духнович, romanized: Oleksandr Vasylovych Dukhnovych; Slovak: Alexander Duchnovič; Russian: Александр Васильевич Духнович, romanized: Aleksandr Vasilyevich Dukhnovich) (24 April 1803 – 30 March 1865) was an Transcarpathian Ruthenian priest, poet, writer, pedagogue, and social activist of the Russophile orientation. He is considered as the awakener (Rusyn: Будитель, Budytel’) of the Rusyns.

== Life ==
Alexander Dukhnovych was born in the village of Topolya, Kingdom of Hungary (now Topoľa in Eastern Slovakia). The son of a Greek Catholic priest, he went to a Hungarian school in Ungvár (now Uzhhorod) (1816 to 1821). Later Alexander studied philosophy at an academy in Kassa (now Košice) (1821–1823), and theology at the Theological Seminary in Ungvár (Uzhhorod) (1824–1827).

In (1827–1830 and 1832), Dukhnovych worked as an archivist and a teacher. Later, in 1833-1838, he worked as a Greek Catholic priest in remote villages of Carpathian Ruthenia (present-day Zakarpattia oblast of Ukraine) and as a notary in Ungvár (Uzhhorod) (1838–1844). Dukhnovych started to write poems in his early years. He wrote in the Ruthenian, Russian, and Hungarian languages. His early works are said to have been influenced by Hungarian Romanticism.

Dukhnovych supported education and cultural revival of Carpathian Ruthenians. He saw his role as a defender of Ruthenian culture against Magyarization. In 1850 Dukhnovych established the first Ruthenian cultural association, the Eperjes (now Prešov) Literary Society. Under his guidance, the society published a series of books. His most famous patriotic poem Ia rusyn byl, ies'm i budu (I Was, Am, and Will Be a Ruthenian) was published as part of an anthology in 1851. This poem would later become a popular hymn of Carpatho-Ruthenians. Dukhnovych also published a number of pedagogical and religious books, elementary school textbook and a Grammar. His most famous scholarly works were The History of the Eparchy of Prjašev (1877), originally published in Latin and later translated in Russian and English, and a History of Carpathian Ruthenians (1853).

His last years were devoted to development of education and schooling among local Ruthenians. In an effort to forestall the Magyarization of the Ruthenian population, Dukhnovych founded the St. John the Baptist Society in Eperjes (Prešov) with Adolf Dobryansky in 1862. Dukhnovych died in Eperjes (Prešov) on 30 March 1865.

== Assessment ==
Dukhnovych is regarded to be one of the outstanding Ruthenian humanists and educators. In the words of Ivan Franko "he made everything so that forgotten Ruthenians revived spiritually". His views were based on Christian principles and idealism.

Dukhnovych also actively participated in the Russophile movement in the territory of today's Western Ukraine at the end of the 19th century. Even though Dukhnovych wrote in the local language, he did not believe it to be a separate language nor did he wish to contribute to a creation of a literary language of Carpathian Ruthenians. Instead Dukhnovych wrote his scholarly works in a peculiar dialect called iazychie made up of Church-Slavonic and local Lemko-Rusyn.

== See also ==
- Alexander Duchnovič Theatre
- Ruthenia
- Carpathian Ruthenia
- Carpatho-Rusyn Society
