= Uzhhorod Gymnasium =

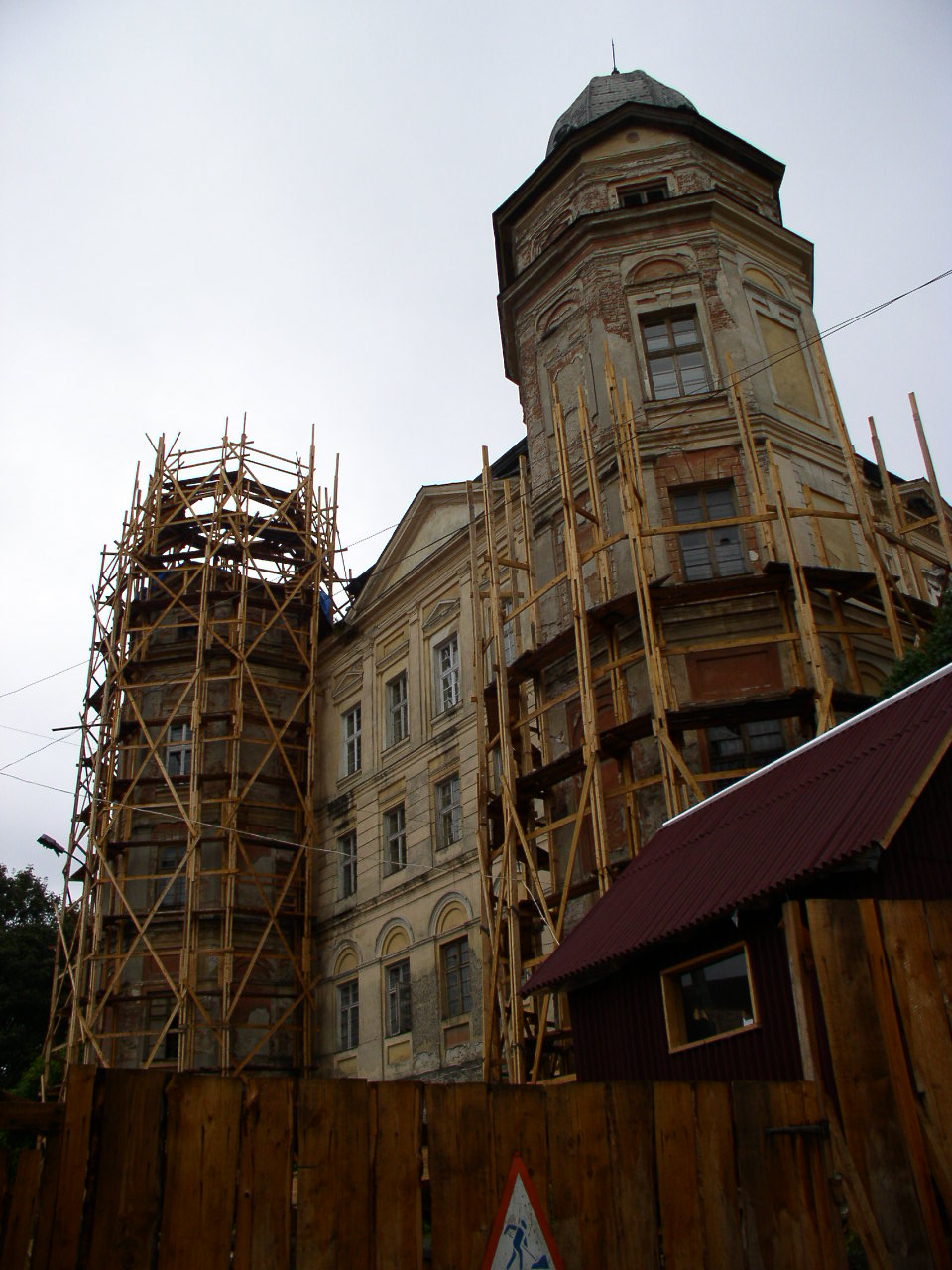
- The building of the former Bishops' Residence in Uzhhorod that once housed Uzhhorod Gymnasium
- Uzhhorod, Zakarpattia Oblast; Ukraine

Information
- Type: Public gymnasium
- Established: 1613; 413 years ago
- Principal: Serhiy Roman
- Grades: 5-12
- Enrollment: 800
- Language: Ukrainian
- Website: gymnasium.uz.ua

Uzhhorod Gymnasium is a public gymnasium school in Uzhhorod, Ukraine.

== History ==
In 1613 the head come of Zemplen and Ung counties Gyorgy Hommonai Drugeth founded a collegium in Humenne. The local jesuit monks were assigned to manage it. In 1640 Gyorgy's son, Janos Hommonai, the state judge, relocated the colegium to Uzhhorod. The facility started to work in 1646. In 1775 Maria Theresia gave the collegium, the Uzhhorod Cathedral and the castle to the Greek Catholic Church.

In the 18th century during the wars of Gabor Bethlen, Gyorgy Rakoczi and Imre Tekeli the First the colegium was closed. During its existence, several buildings in Uzhhorod served as the gymnasium's campus:

- 1646–1785 – the building of the Jesuit college
- 1785–1895 – the former building of the Uzhhorod City Hall

In 1895 a new building for the gymnasium campus was built in downtown Uzhhorod. Now, this building serves as a campus for Uzhhorod National University Department of Chemistry.

The Gymnasium was closed in 1945 by the Soviet authorities. Uzhhorod Gymnasium was reopened on April 19, 1994, in the newly built modern building on 8 March Street.

== Admissions ==
Admission is selective and, in most cases, is through a preparatory course lasting three months.

== After graduation ==
Almost all of Uzhhorod Gymnasium graduates proceed to select universities and facilities of further education. The graduation rate is virtually 100%, the admissions rate above 95%. In the last years, Uzhhorod Gymnasium sent several students to leading universities in Ukraine, Europe and the United States.
