= Iazychie =

East-Slavic artificial literary language

Iazychie (Ukrainian: Язичіє, romanized: Yazychiie; Rusyn: Язычіє, romanized: Yazŷchiie) was an artificial literary East Slavic language used in the 19th century and the early 20th century in Halychyna, Bukovina, and Zakarpattia in publishing, particularly by Ukrainian and Carpatho-Rusyn Russophiles (Moskvophiles). It was an unsystematic combination of Russian with the lexical, phonetic and grammatical elements of vernacular Ukrainian and Rusyn, Church Slavonic, Ruthenian, Polish, and Old Slavic.

The term was introduced by Ukrainophiles, who used it pejoratively. Nikolay Chernyshevsky called "Iazychie" a mutilation of the language and sharply condemned it. Ivan Franko and other representatives of the contemporary territories of today's Western Ukraine's progressive intelligentsia also opposed "Iazychie". The proponents of the language themselves called it the "traditional Carpatho-Rusyn language". Russophiles saw it as a tool against Polish influence and a transition to Russian literary language, considering local dialects to be a "speech of swineherds and shepherds".

== Text example ==
Що єсть тепло и свѣтло — того дово̂дно оучени̂ єще не знаютъ. Но безъ свѣтла и тепла нїяка изъ нашихъ пашниць не може оудатися. — Свѣтло, здаеся, возбуджае въ рослинахъ силу, которою они оуглянный квасъ, амонїякъ, воду, и другое поживлѣнье розкладаютъ на части, зъ ıакихъ тїи рѣчи повстаютъ, — и — потребное въ себе вживаютъ, остальное же назадъ воздухови о̂тдаютъ. На пр. оугляный квасъ розкладаютъ они на єго части, на квасородъ и оуглеродъ, и оуглеродъ вживаютъ въ себе, квасородъ же о̂тдаютъ воздухови, и тымъ способомъ воздухъ все о̂тсвѣжуютъ. Но все то дѣеся лишь днемъ при свѣтлѣ солнечно̂мъ, ночїю же нѣ; и также днемъ при захмарено̂мъ небѣ робота тая оуже имъ складно не иде, а для тоговъ хмарнїи роки овощи николи не буваютъ смачни̂ та тревали̂. (1875)
