= Uzhhorod Synagogue =

Former synagogue in Uzhhorod, Ukraine

- Ukrainian: Ужгородська Синагога
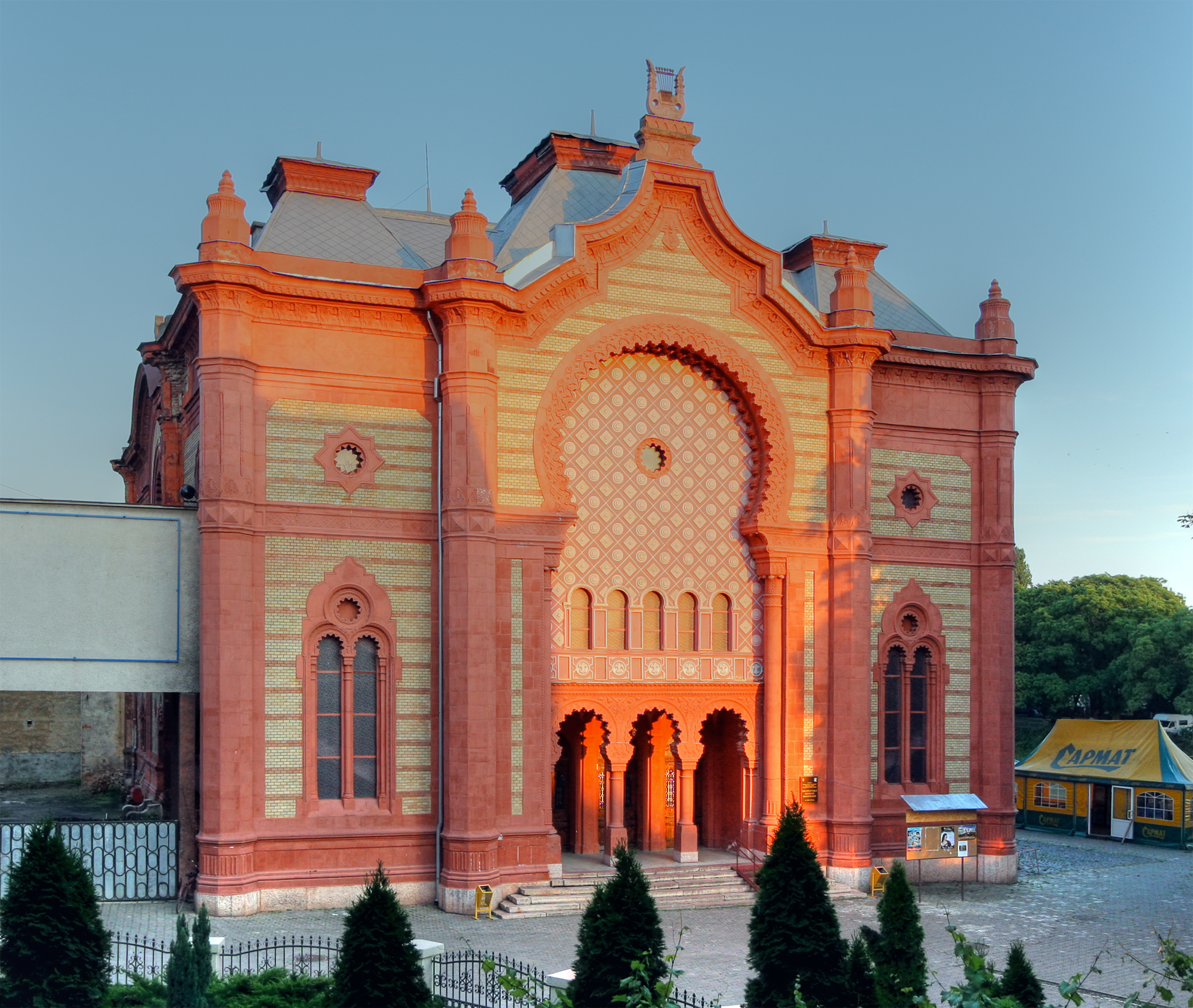
- The former synagogue, now concert hall, in 2009

- Location of the former synagogue in Ukraine

Religion
- Affiliation: Orthodox Judaism (former)
- Rite: Nusach Ashkenaz
- Ecclesiastical or organizational status: Synagogue (1904–c. 1944); Concert hall (since 1947)
- Status: Abandoned and repossessed; Repurposed (as a concert hall)

Location
- Location: Uzhhorod
- Country: Ukraine
- Interactive map of Uzhhorod Synagogue
- Coordinates: 48°37′21″N 22°18′4″E

Architecture
- Architects: Gyula Papp; Ferenc Szabolcs
- Type: Synagogue architecture
- Style: Byzantine Revival; Moorish Revival
- Completed: 1904
- Dome: One

The Uzhhorod Synagogue is a former Orthodox Jewish synagogue in Uzhhorod, in the present day Zakarpattia Oblast of western Ukraine. When it was established in 1904, it was located within the Austro-Hungarian Empire. The congregation worshipped in the Ashkenazi rite.

Acquired by the Soviet Government in 1947, the former synagogue building has been used as a concert hall.

== Synagogue ==
The synagogue was completed and dedicated on July 27, 1904. It was then part of the Lands of the Crown of St. Stephen within the Austro-Hungarian Empire.

The building was designed by the architects Gyula Papp and Ferenc Szabolcs, in a flamboyant Romantic style that boldly intermingled Byzantine Revival and Moorish Revival architectural elements. The image of the Star of David on the central balcony of the building façade was a notable feature.

== Concert hall ==
In 1944, after the destruction of the Carpathian Jews, the fate of the synagogue changed. In 1947, the Soviet government gave the synagogue to the USSR Ministry of Culture, and the building has served as Uzhhorod's concert hall, prized for its acoustics. It has housed the Regional Philharmonic Society with the Transcarpathian Folk Choir.

All Jewish symbols were removed from the building, although as of 2012 there was a plaque on the facade commemorating the 85,000 Jews from Zakarpattia Oblast who were murdered in The Holocaust. As of 2015, plans were announced to restore the glass dome with its mosaics. However, by 2019 those plans were yet to be realised, with a local congregation occasionally using the former synagogue for Jewish events.

== See also ==
- History of the Jews in Ukraine
- Former synagogues in Ukraine

== Gallery ==
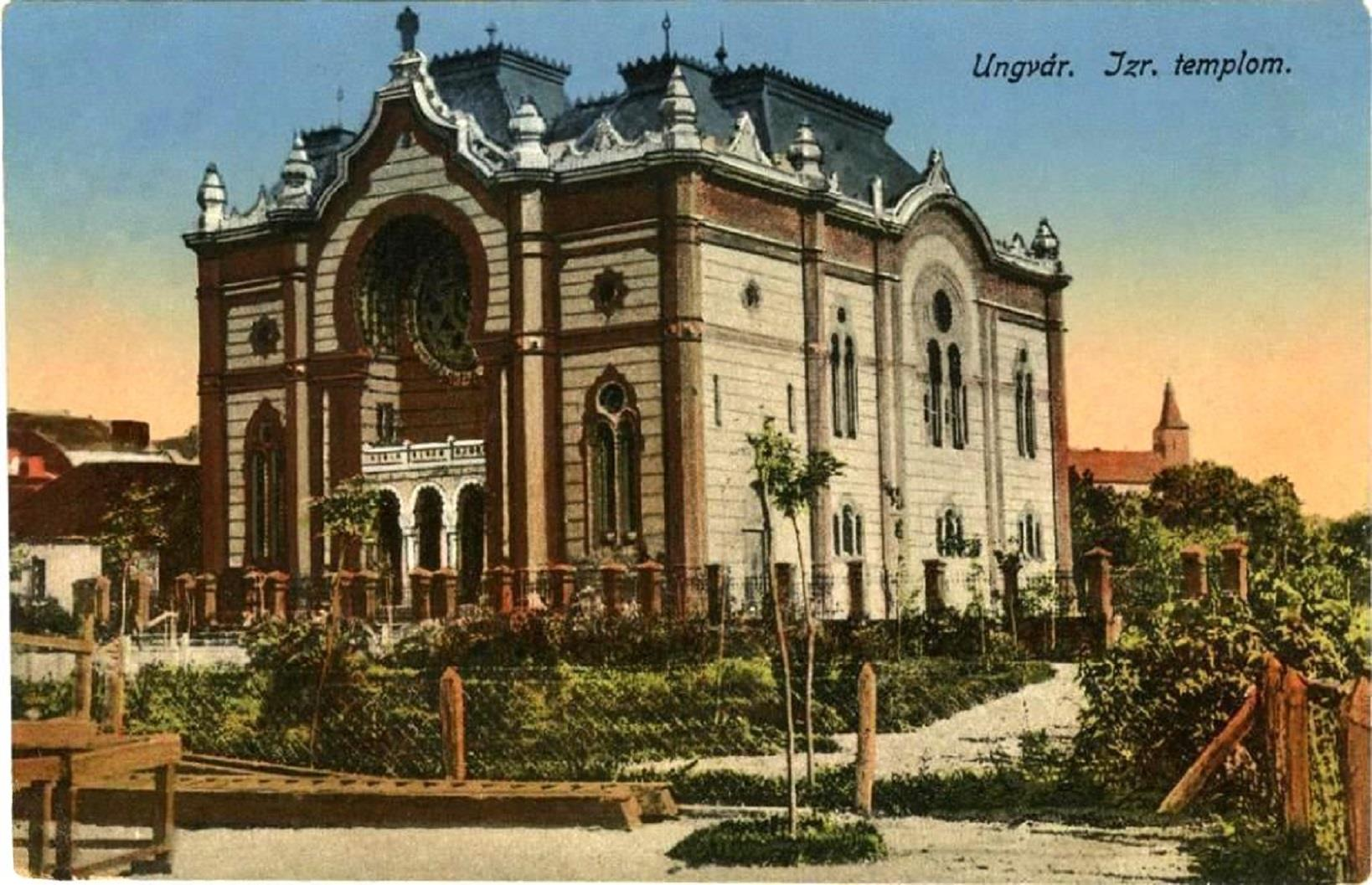

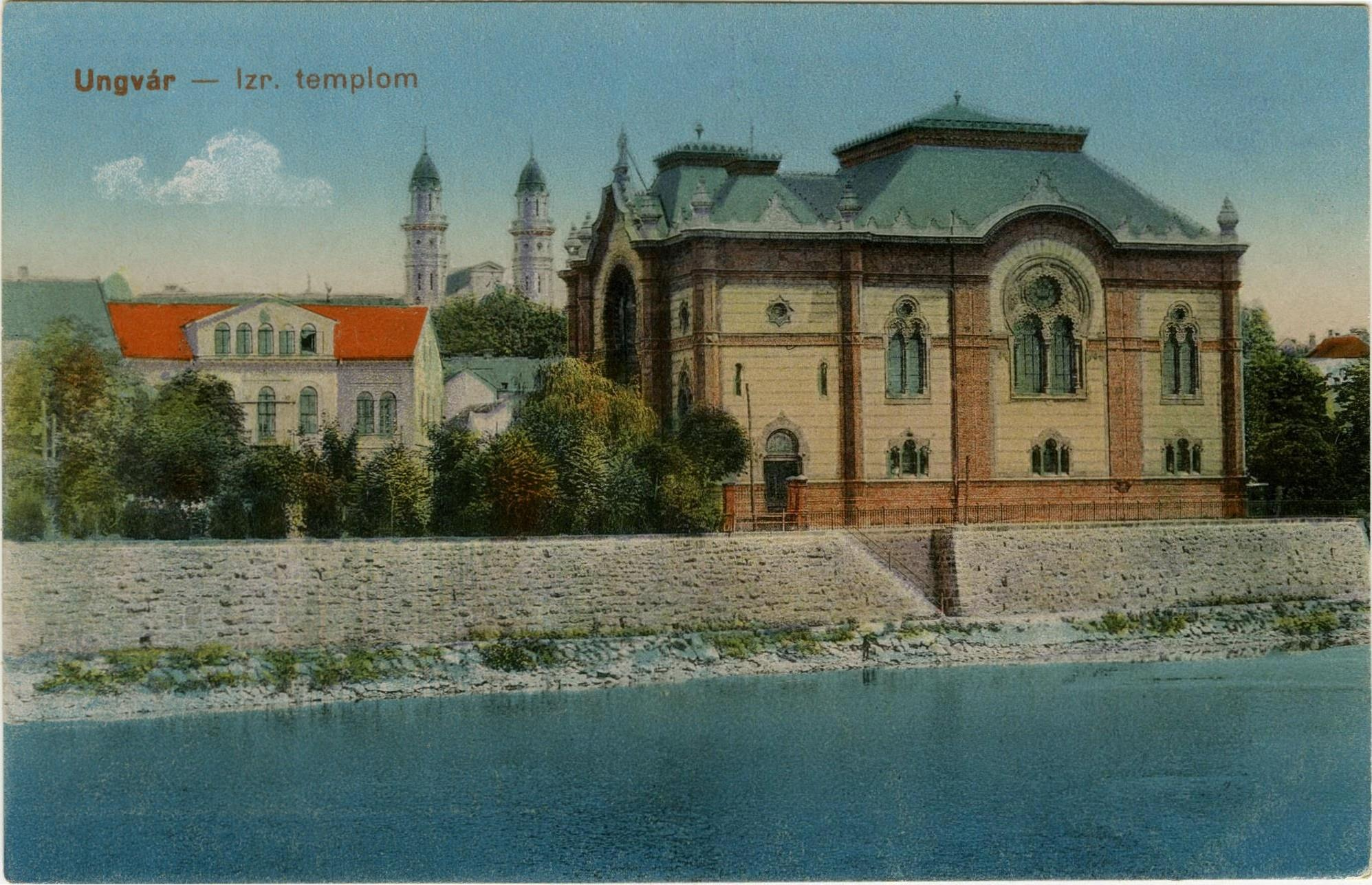

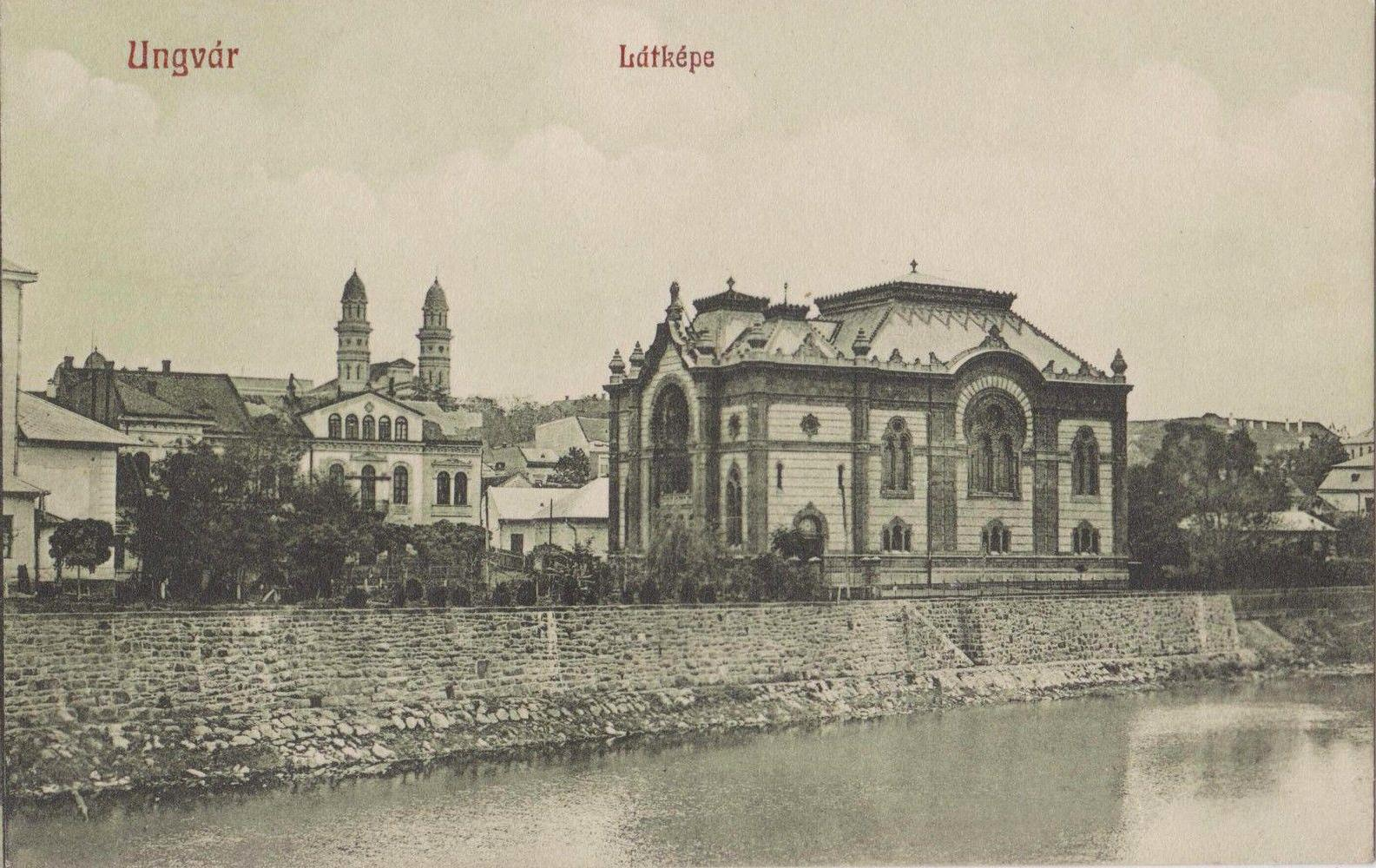

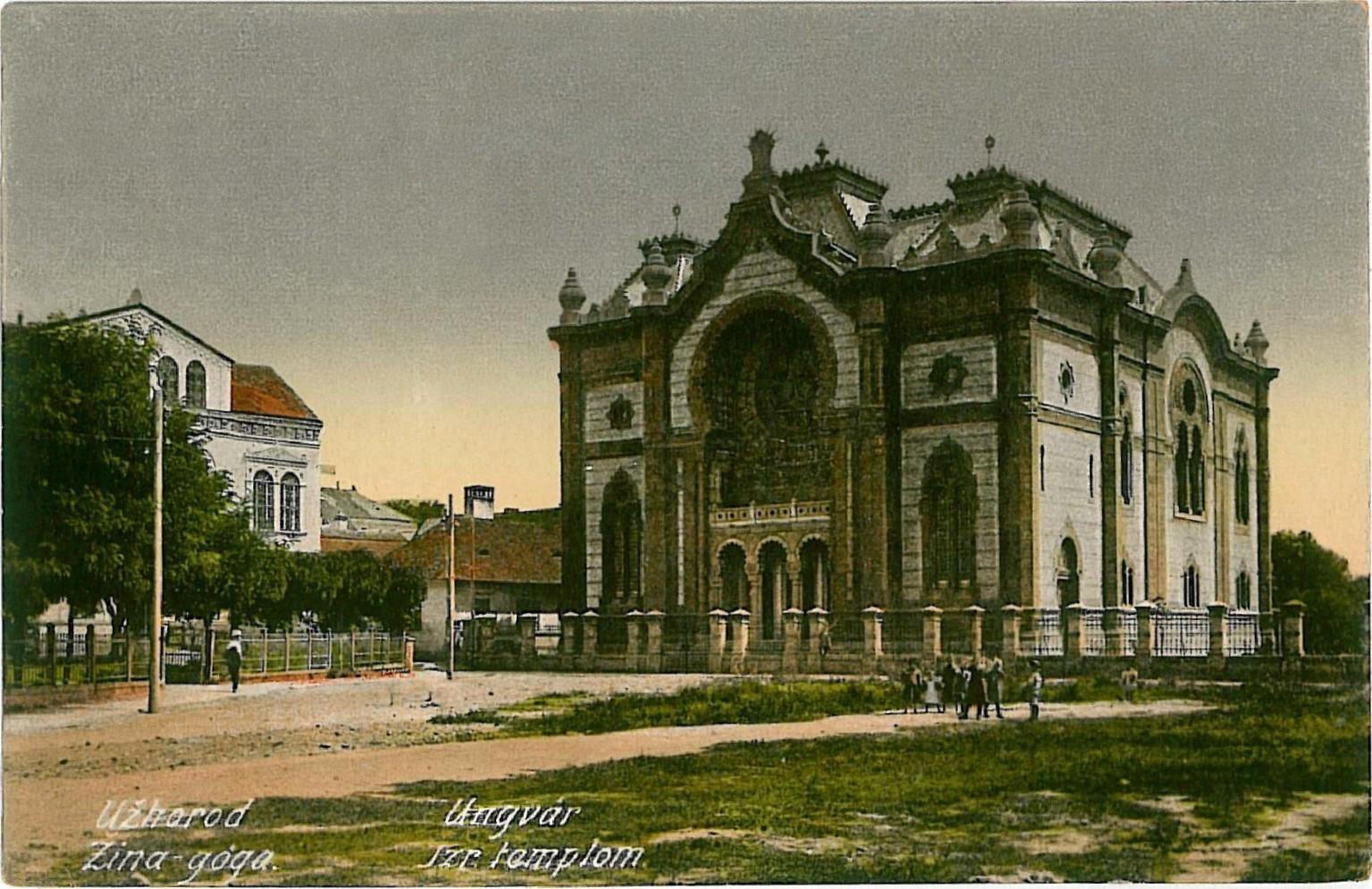

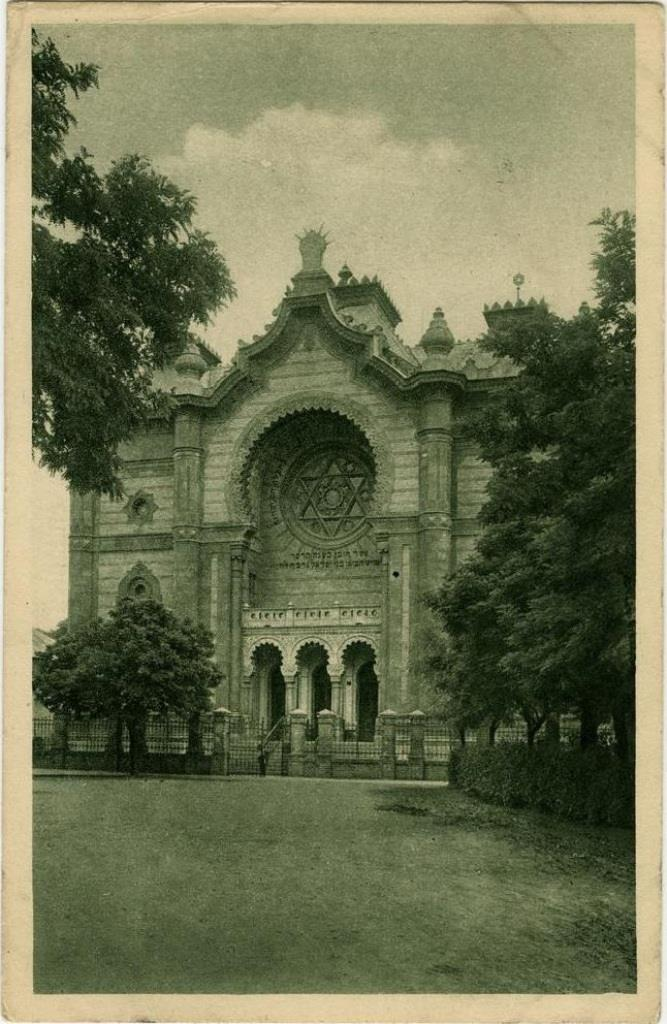

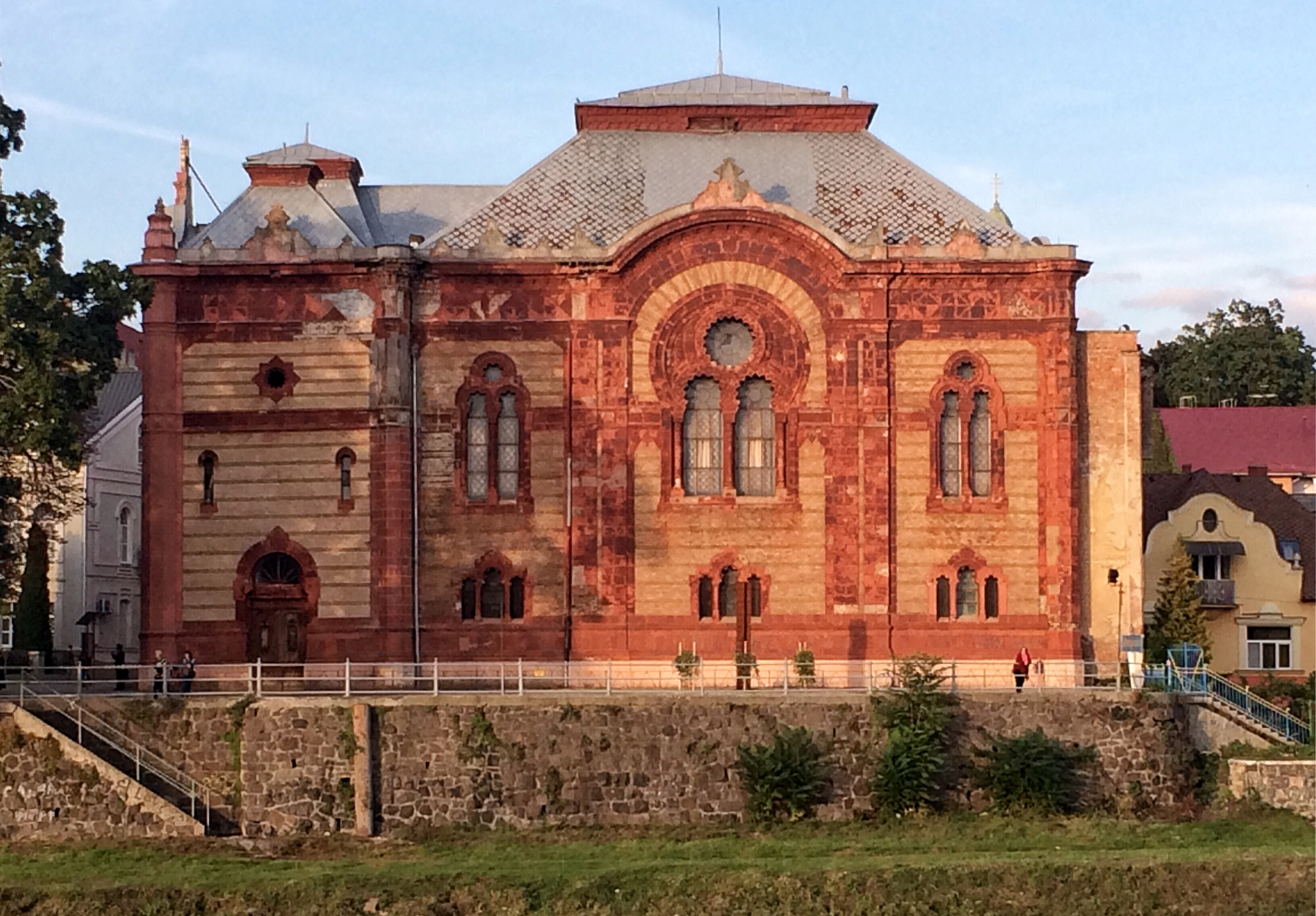

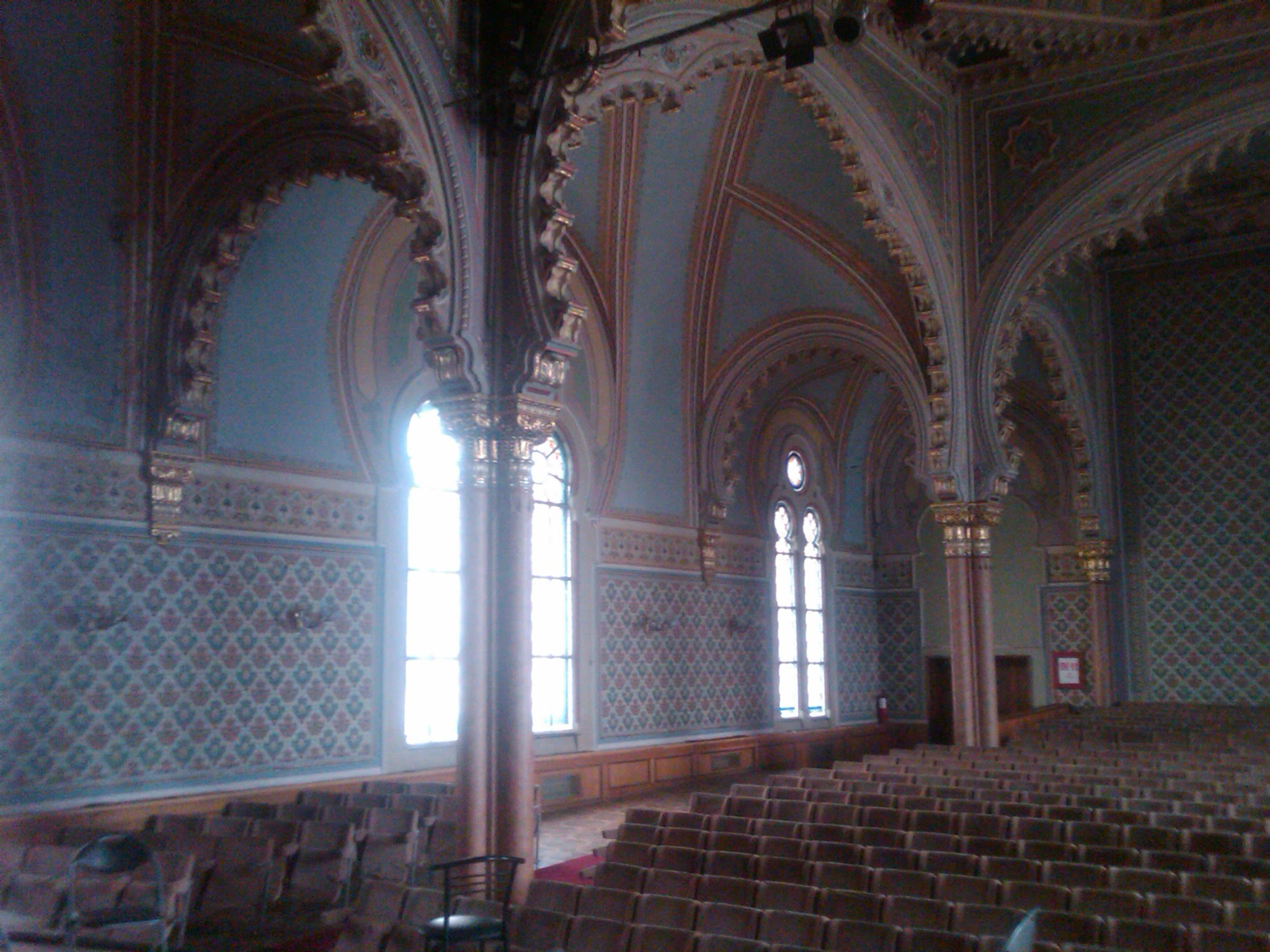
Interior of Uzhhorod Synagogue in 2010
