= Ján Vályi =

- Bishop of Prešov
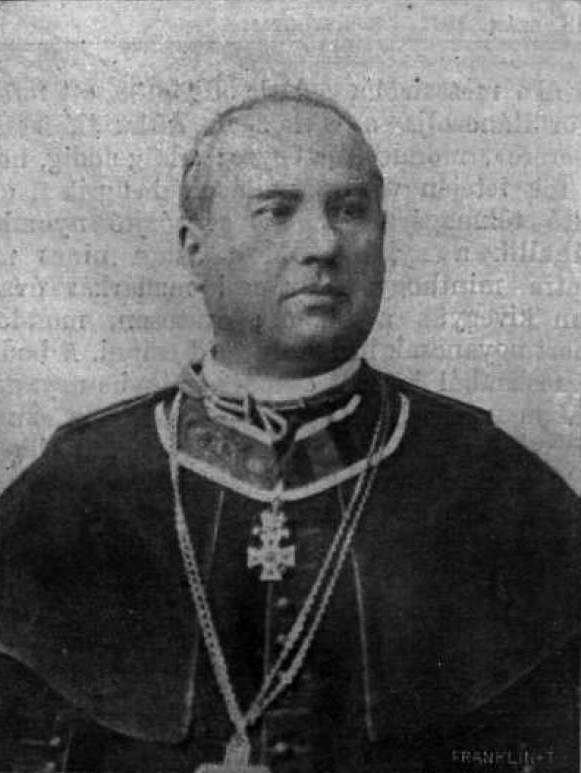
- Bishop Ján Vályi; photograph by Ferenc Veress
- Church: Slovak Greek Catholic Church
- Diocese: Eparchy of Prešov
- In office: 15 March 1883 – 19 November 1911
- Predecessor: Mikuláš Tóth
- Successor: Štefan Novák

Orders
- Ordination: 26 October 1865 by Jozef Gaganec
- Consecration: 20 May 1883 by Ivan Pasteliy

Personal details
- Born: 22 September 1837 Gávavencsellő, Kingdom of Hungary, Austrian Empire
- Died: 19 November 1911 (aged 74) Prešov, Kingdom of Hungary, Transleithania, Austria-Hungary

Ján Vályi or János Vályi (22 September 1837 – 19 November 1911) was a Slovak Greek Catholic hierarch. He was the bishop of Slovak Catholic Eparchy of Prešov from 1883 to 1911.

Born in Vencsellő, Austrian Empire (present day – Hungary) in 1837, he was ordained a priest on 26 October 1865. He was appointed as the Bishop of Eparchy by the Holy See on 15 March 1883. He was consecrated to the Episcopate on 20 May 1883. The principal consecrator was Bishop Ivan Pasteliy, and the principal co-consecrator were Bishop Juraj Čásky and Bishop Lörinc Schlauch.

He died in Prešov on 19 November 1911.

Catholic Church titles
Preceded by Mikuláš Tóth	Slovak Catholic Eparchy of Prešov; 1883–1911	Succeeded by Štefan Novák
