= Stefan Pankovych =

Ruthenian Greek Catholic hierarch

- Bishop of Mukachevo
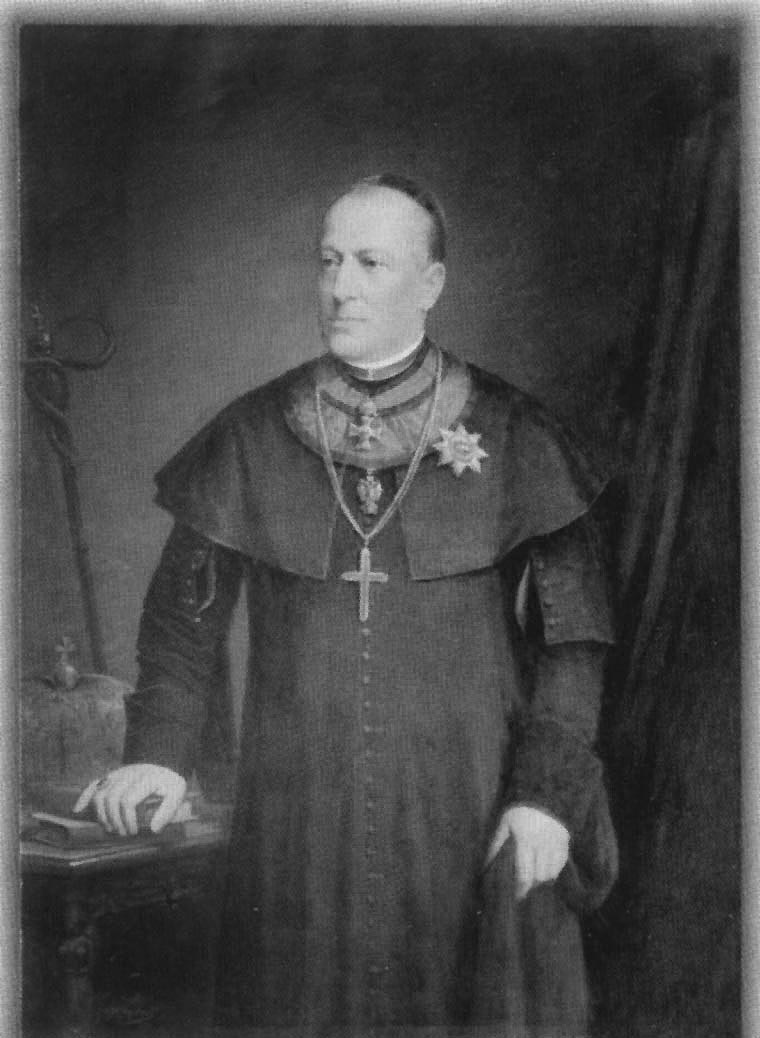
- Native name: Pankovics István
- Church: Ruthenian Greek Catholic Church
- Diocese: Eparchy of Mukachevo
- In office: 22 February 1867 – 29 August 1874
- Predecessor: Vasyl Popovych
- Successor: Ivan Pasteliy

Orders
- Ordination: 27 August 1851
- Consecration: 5 May 1867 by Jozef Gaganec

Personal details
- Born: 29 October 1820 Velejte, Kingdom of Hungary, Austrian Empire
- Died: 29 August 1874 (aged 53) Ungvár, Kingdom of Hungary, Transleithania, Austria-Hungary

Stefan Pankovych (Ukrainian: Стефан Панкович, Hungarian: Pankovics István; 29 October 1820 – 29 August 1874) was a Ruthenian Greek Catholic hierarch. He was bishop of the Ruthenian Catholic Eparchy of Mukacheve from 1867 to 1874.

Born in Veľaty, Austrian Empire (present day – Slovakia) in 1820, he was ordained a priest on 27 August 1851. He was confirmed as the Bishop by the Holy See on 22 February 1867. He was consecrated to the Episcopate on 5 May 1867. The principal consecrator was Bishop Jozef Gaganec.

He died in Uzhhorod on 29 August 1874.

Catholic Church titles
| Preceded by Vasyl Popovych | Ruthenian Catholic Bishop of Mukacheve; 1867–1874 | Succeeded by Ivan Pasteliy |
