= Mikuláš Tóth (bishop) =

- Bishop of Prešov
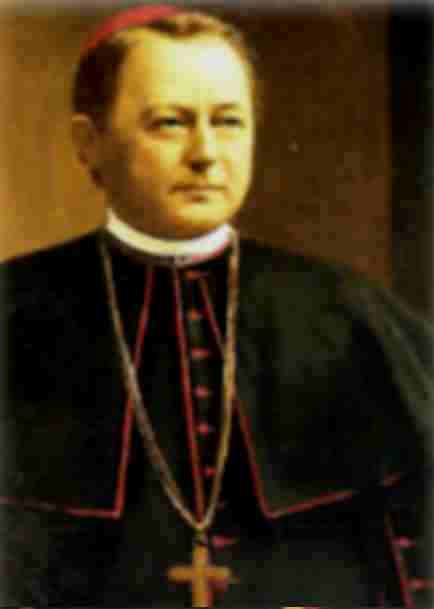
- Church: Slovak Greek Catholic Church
- Diocese: Eparchy of Prešov
- In office: 3 April 1876 – 21 May 1882
- Predecessor: Jozef Gaganec
- Successor: Ján Vályi

Orders
- Ordination: 18 December 1857 by Vasyl Popovych
- Consecration: 21 May 1876 by Ivan Pasteliy

Personal details
- Born: 10 August 1833 Mukacheve, Kingdom of Hungary, Austrian Empire
- Died: 21 May 1882 (aged 48) Prešov, Kingdom of Hungary, Transleithania, Austria-Hungary

Mikuláš Tóth (Ukrainian: Микола Товт; 10 August 1833 – 21 May 1882) was a Slovak Greek Catholic hierarch. He was the bishop of Slovak Catholic Eparchy of Prešov from 1876 to 1882.

Born in Mukacheve, Austrian Empire (present day – Ukraine) in the Ruthenian family in 1833, he was ordained a priest on 18 December 1857 for the Ruthenian Catholic Eparchy of Mukacheve. He was appointed as the Bishop of Eparchy by the Holy See on 3 April 1876. He was consecrated to the Episcopate on 21 May 1876. The principal consecrator was Bishop Ivan Pasteliy, and the principal co-consecrator was Bishop Juraj Čásky.

He died unexpected in Prešov on 21 May 1882.

Bishop Mikuláš Tóth was the paternal uncle of St. Alexis Toth, the former Eastern Catholic priest who converted to Orthodoxy and is widely regarded as the founder of American Orthodoxy.

Catholic Church titles
Preceded by Jozef Gaganec	Slovak Catholic Eparchy of Prešov; 1876–1882	Succeeded by Ján Vályi
