= Kobylnice =

Kobylnice may refer to places:

== Czech Republic ==
- Kobylnice (Kutná Hora District), a municipality and village in the Central Bohemian Region
- Kobylnice (Mladá Boleslav District), a municipality and village in the Central Bohemian Region
- Kobylnice (Brno-Country District), a municipality and village in the South Moravian Region
- Kobylnice, a village and part of Koroužné in the Vysočina Region

== Slovakia ==
- Kobylnice (Svidník District), a municipality and village
