= Alexis Toth =

Slovak-born American Russian Orthodox church leader

Saint Alexis Toth
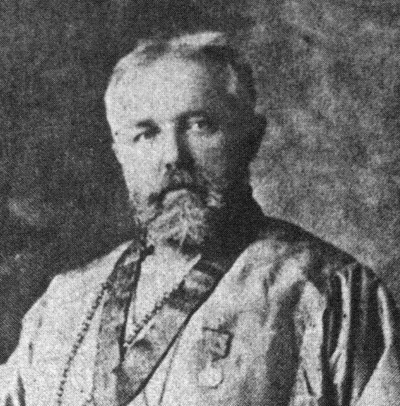

Confessor and Defender of Orthodoxy
- Born: March 14, 1853; Kobylnice, Austrian Empire
- Died: May 7, 1909 (age 56); Wilkes-Barre, Pennsylvania, US
- Venerated in: Eastern Orthodox Church
- Canonized: 1994 by Orthodox Church in America
- Major shrine: Saint Tikhon's Monastery, South Canaan, Pennsylvania
- Feast: Commemorated on May 7

Alexis Georgievich Toth (Note: Rusyn: Алексѣй Григорович Товт, romanized: Aleksy Hryhorovych Tovt; Hungarian: Tóth Elek; Russian: Алексей Георгиевич Товт, romanized: Aleksey Georgiyevich Tovt.) (also Alexis of Wilkes-Barre; March 14, 1853 – May 7, 1909) was a Ruthenian priest who later became a Russian Orthodox missionary in the United States.

He was born in the village of Kobylnice in Slovakia, near Prešov, belonging then to Sáros County of the Kingdom of Hungary (part of the Austro-Hungarian Empire). Toth belonged to the Rusyn (Ruthenian) ethnic group that inhabited the Carpathian region.

Toth was originally a Greek Catholic priest. After being rejected by the American Catholic bishop John Ireland, he and many of his parishioners converted to Eastern Orthodoxy, leading to the reception of an estimated 20,000 Eastern Catholics into the Russian Orthodox Church. This movement significantly contributed to the growth of Orthodoxy in the United States and the eventual formation of the Orthodox Church in America. He was glorified as a saint by the Orthodox Church in 1994.

== Early life ==
Alexis Toth was born to George and Cecilia Toth (or Tovt) on March 14, 1853, in Kobylnice, near Prešov, in Sáros County of the Kingdom of Hungary (then part of the Austro-Hungarian Empire). He belonged to the Rusyn (Ruthenian) ethnic group, which inhabited the Carpathian highlands. Having completed his primary schooling, he attended a Latin Catholic seminary for one year, followed by three years in a Greek Catholic seminary and later at Charles University in Prague, where he graduated with a degree in theology.

Toth married Rosalie Mihalics on March 12, 1878, and was ordained to the priesthood in 1878 by his paternal uncle, Bishop Mikuláš Tóth, the Greek Catholic Bishop of Prešov. Following the death of his wife and child a few years later, he served in local parishes, as diocesan chancellor, and as professor and director at the Greek Catholic seminary of Prešov. In 1889, Fr. Alexis' bishop received a petition from the Ruthenian Catholic Church in the United States, asking that Toth be sent to them as a priest. He arrived on November 15, 1889, and by the 27th of that month was holding services at St. Mary's Greek Catholic Church in Minneapolis, Minnesota. Finding the church barely furnished and deeply in debt, he set about rectifying the situation, ultimately bringing the parish to a place of fiscal stability whilst never drawing a salary.

== Conflict with Bishop John Ireland ==
As an Eastern Catholic, Toth honored the custom of paying a visit to the local Latin Church bishop in his area, since there was no Eastern Catholic bishop serving in the United States at that time. The ordinary of the Archdiocese of Saint Paul and Minneapolis was John Ireland, who had been attempting to "Americanize" German and other Catholic immigrants, and was hostile to ethnic parishes such as the one in which Toth served.

When speaking of their meeting, Toth later claimed that Ireland became angry and threw Toth's priestly credentials onto his table while ardently protesting his presence in the city. Toth reported that Ireland said he did not consider Toth or his bishop to be truly Catholic, in clear contradiction of the Union of Uzhhorod and papal decrees to the contrary. Toth reported that the conversation became more heated as it progressed, with both men losing their tempers. Ireland refused to give Toth permission to serve as a priest in Minneapolis, and furthermore ordered his parishes and priests not to have anything to do with the Ruthenian Catholic priest or his parishioners. Although Toth sent letters to his bishop in Hungary, detailing his experience and requesting specific instructions, he reportedly never received a reply.

Toth came to believe that he and other Eastern Catholic priests in North America were to be recalled to Europe, and their parishioners folded into existing Western Catholic congregations in their respective cities.

== From Rome to Russian Orthodoxy ==
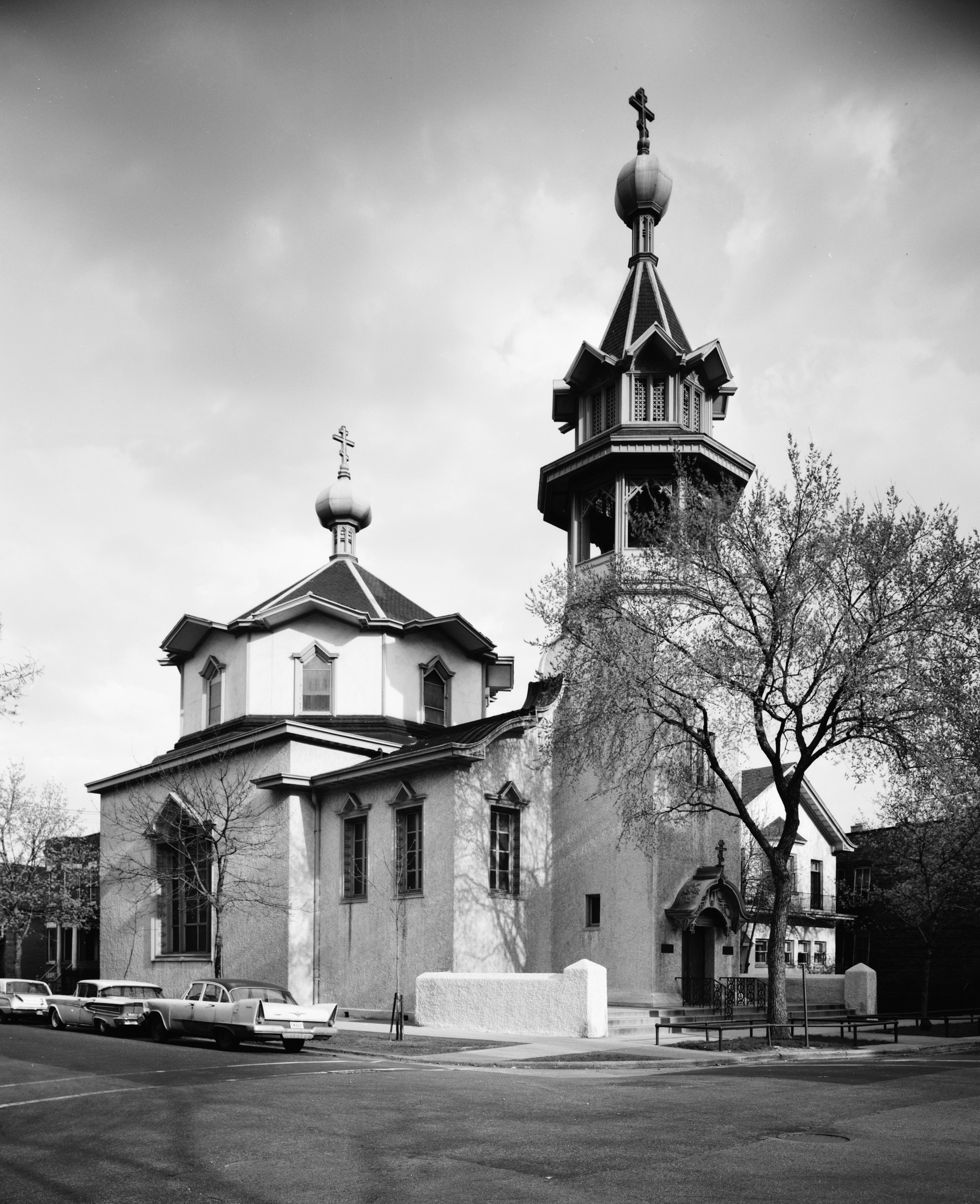
Holy Trinity Orthodox Cathedral, where Saint Alexis served from 1891 to 1895

Having heard nothing from his own bishop, he and other Eastern Catholic priests who had shared similar experiences began to cast about for a solution to their dilemma. In December 1890, they contacted the Russian consul in San Francisco, California, asking to be put in touch with a Russian Orthodox bishop. Correspondence and personal meetings with Bishop Vladimir Sokolovsky of San Francisco followed, culminating in Toth's decision to formally enter the Russian Orthodox Church in March 1892. Toth was accompanied by 361 fellow Eastern Catholics; thousands more would follow in the years to come, largely due to his own efforts to evangelize them toward this move.

Following his conversion to Orthodoxy, Toth tirelessly preached his new faith to other Eastern Catholics in North America. This, combined with further demands by U.S. Latin bishops against Eastern Rite parishes facilitated the conversion of over 20,000 Eastern-rite Catholics to Russian Orthodoxy by the time Toth died in 1909. The Orthodox Church in America has claimed that by 1916 the Latin Catholic Church had lost 163 Eastern Rite parishes, with over 100,000 faithful, to the Russian missionary diocese.

== Death and glorification ==
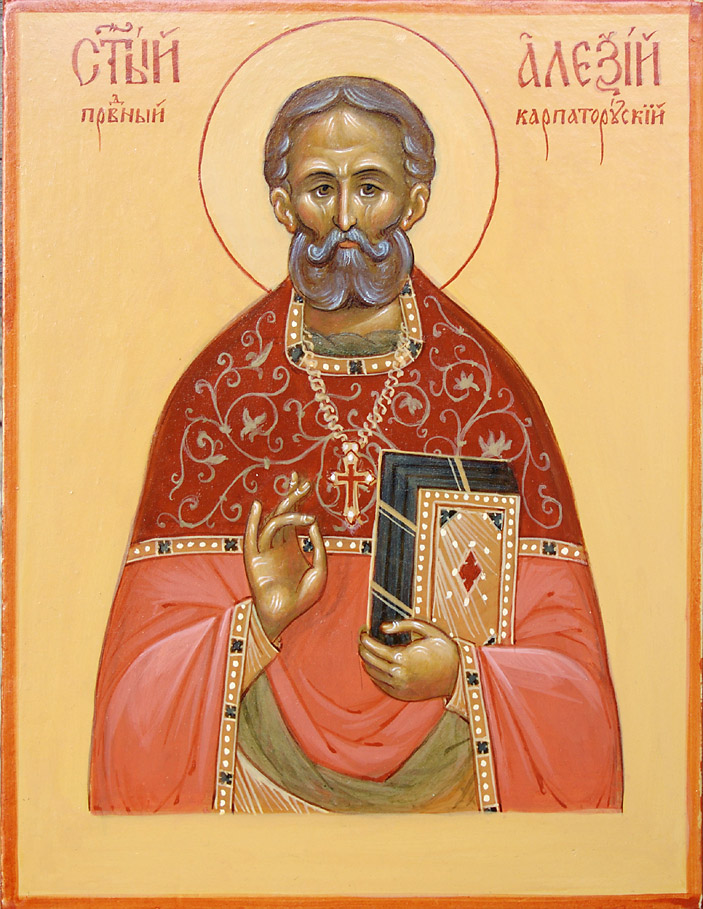
Icon of Saint Alexis of Wilkes-Barre, 2012

Toth was elevated to the rank of protopresbyter later in life, continuing his efforts to convert the Eastern Catholics of North America to Eastern Orthodoxy. He died on May 7, 1909, in Wilkes-Barre, Pennsylvania, and was honored with a special shrine at St. Tikhon's Monastery in South Canaan, Pennsylvania. On May 29, 1994, Toth was glorified as Saint Alexis of Wilkes-Barre by the Orthodox Church in America.
