= Gregor Tarkovič =

Gregor Tarkovič.jpg
- Bishop of Prešov
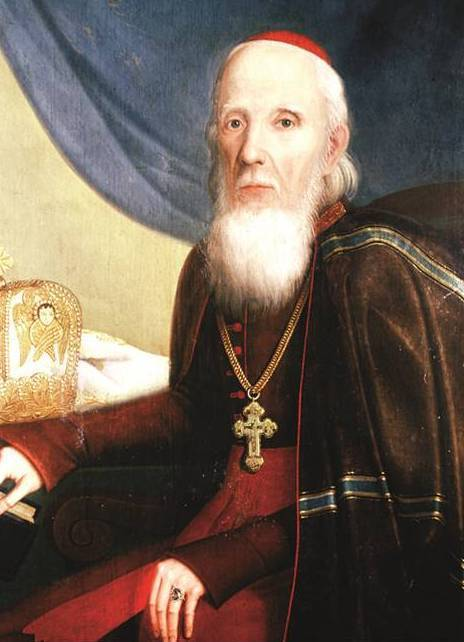
- Native name: Таркович Григорій
- Church: Slovak Greek Catholic Church
- Diocese: Eparchy of Prešov
- In office: 2 October 1818 – 16 January 1841
- Predecessor: Position established
- Successor: Jozef Gaganec

Orders
- Ordination: 1 January 1779 by Andriy Bachynskyi
- Consecration: 17 June 1821 by Oleksiy Povchiy

Personal details
- Born: 19 November 1754 Pasika, Kingdom of Hungary, Habsburg Realm
- Died: 16 January 1841 (aged 86) Prešov, Kingdom of Hungary, Austrian Empire

Gregor Tarkovič (Ukrainian: Григорій Таркович; 19 November 1754 – 16 January 1841) was a Slovak Greek Catholic hierarch. He was the first bishop of the new created Slovak Catholic Eparchy of Prešov from 1818 to 1841.

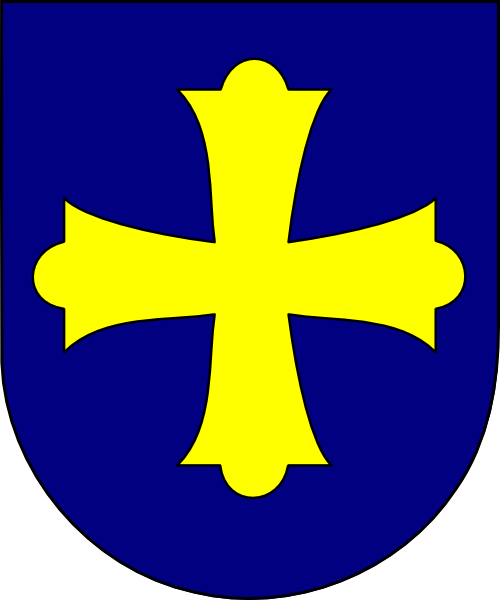
Coat of arms of Bishop Gregor Tarkovič

Born in Pasika, Kingdom of Hungary (present day – Ukraine) in the Ruthenian family in 1754, he was ordained a priest on 1 January 1779 for the Ruthenian Catholic Eparchy of Mukacheve. He was confirmed as the first Bishop of the new created Eparchy by the Holy See on 2 October 1818. He was consecrated to the Episcopate on 17 June 1821. The principal consecrator was Bishop Oleksiy Povchiy.

He died in Prešov on 16 January 1841.

Catholic Church titles
New title	Slovak Catholic Eparchy of Prešov; 1818–1841	Succeeded by Jozef Gaganec
