= Géza Vastagh =

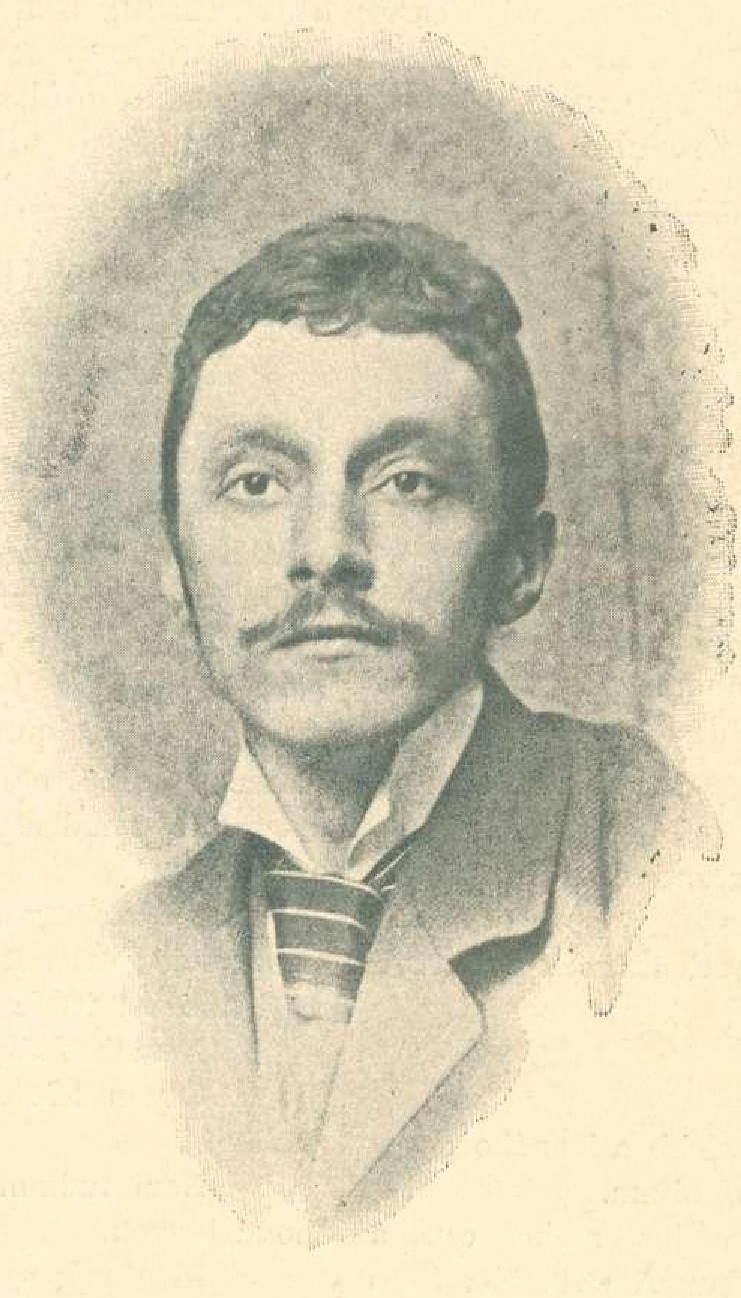
Géza Vastagh; from A Természet (1899)

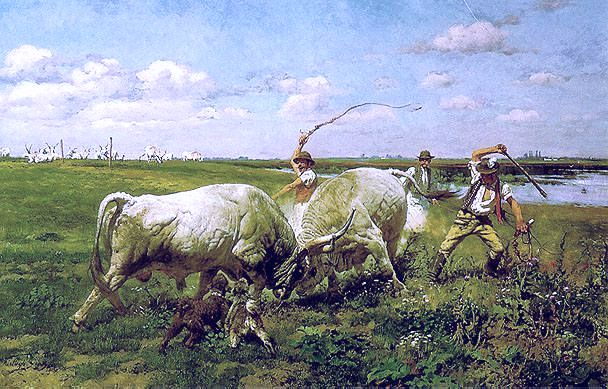
Fighting Bulls

Géza Jenő Ferenc Vastagh (3 September 1866, in Kolozsvár – 5 November 1919, in Budapest) was a Hungarian painter; specializing in animals.

== Life and work ==
His father, György Vastagh, was a painter. His brother, György, became a sculptor; as did his niece, Éva, and his nephew, László.

After studying at a Piarist secondary school in Budapest, he went to Munich in 1886. There, he enrolled at a private school, operated by Simon Hollósy, followed by studies at the Academy of Fine Arts under Gabriel von Hackl. In 1887, he held his first exhibition at the Glaspalast. That same year his painting, "Resting Peasant", was purchased by Emperor Franz Joseph I. The following year, he returned briefly to Budapest, then made a study trip to France. During this period, he sent many of his works to England and the United States.

His interests later turned to animals; notably cattle. His painting "Ki a legény a csordában?" (Who is the Bachelor of the Herd?), was awarded a gold medal and made into an etching by Jenő Doby. He created several huge canvases on related themes. In 1898, a state scholarship enabled him to spend four months in Algeria and Tunisia, where he studied lions, their habits and living conditions; taking photographs as well as making sketches. After the turn of the century, he made studies at zoos in Hamburg, Leipzig, and Berlin.

In 1906, he married Margit Zsigmondy, daughter of the mechanical engineer, Béla Zsigmondy. They had three children. A few years later, he took a break from his usual subjects and painted landscapes in the Tatras.

In addition to his paintings, he created illustrations for several books, including the Hungarian edition of Tierleben (The Life of Animals), by Alfred Brehm.

A major retrospective of his works was held in 1920. They were also shown in 1934, at a centenary honoring his father, and again in 2004, at an exhibition honoring the entire Vastagh family, in the Ernst Museum. Many of his works may be seen at the Hungarian National Gallery and the Hungarian Agricultural Museum.

== Sources ==
- Lyka Károly: Festészeti életünk a millenniumtól az első világháborúig (Our paintings from the Millennium to the First World War). Corvina, 1983 ISBN 978-963-13-1632-2
- Seregélyi György (ed.), Magyar festők és grafikusok adattára (Database of Hungarian Painters and Graphic Artists), self-published, 1988 ISBN 978-963-500-817-9
- "Géza Vastagh", in: Erdélyi Művészet (Transylvanian Art), 2016 (Online)
