= György Vastagh (sculptor) =

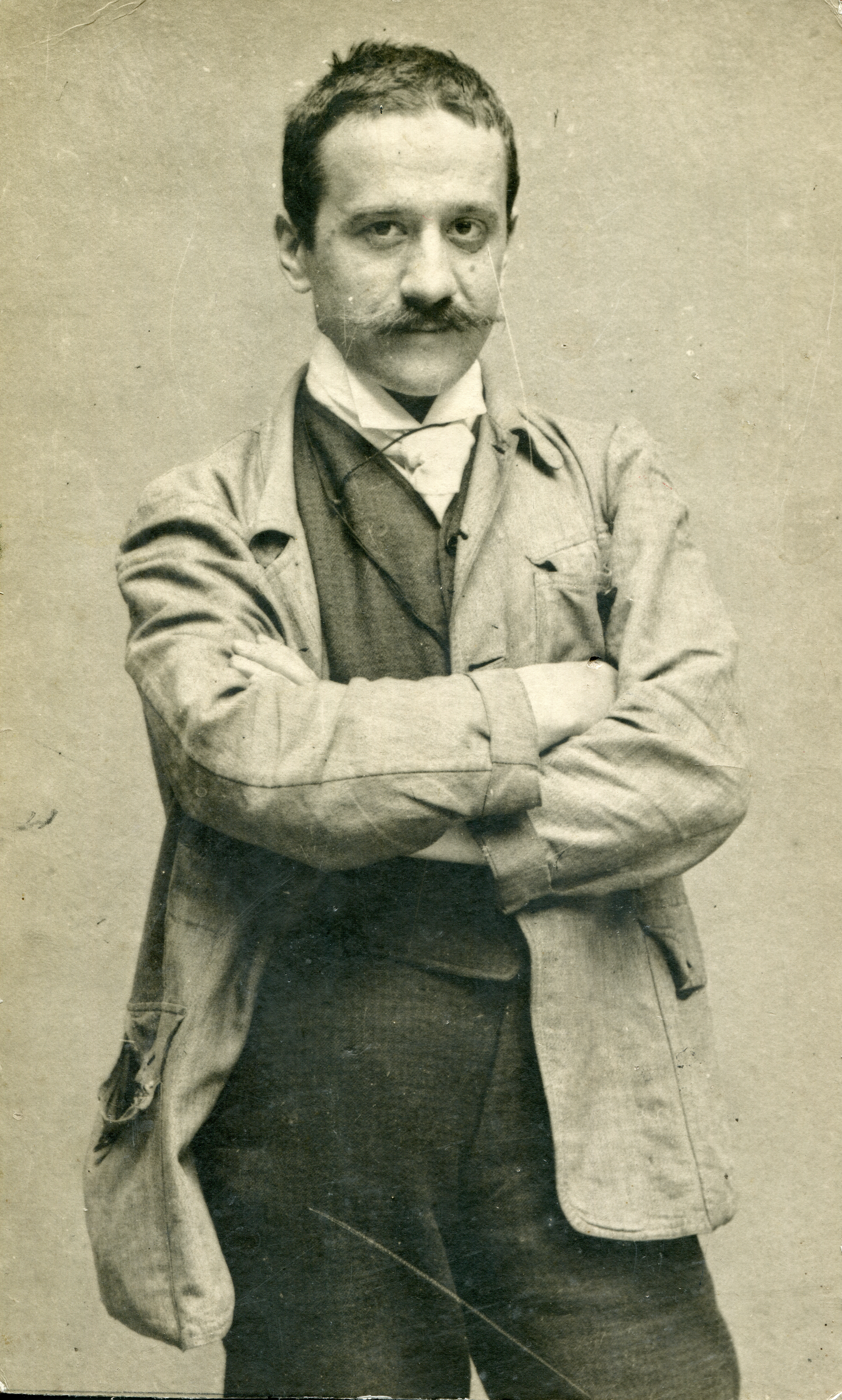
György Vastagh (date unknown)

György Vastagh (18 September 1868, Kolozsvár - 3 June 1946, Budapest) was a Hungarian sculptor. His works are in traditional Romantic and Classical styles. Most of them are monuments or memorials, although he is also known for sculptures of animals.

== Life and work ==
His father, also named György Vastagh, was a painter. His brother, Géza, became a painter as well; specializing in animals. His first teacher was György Zala. From 1889 to 1891, he studied at the Academy of Fine Arts, Munich, with drawing classes from Gabriel von Hackl and lessons in modeling from Syrius Eberle.

His first publicly erected work was the National Monument in Pápa (1889). A year later, he entered a competition, sponsored by the city of Kolozsvár, to create a monument for Matthias Corvinus on the 400th anniversary of his death, but the commission was awarded to János Fadrusz. A study trip to Paris followed in 1893, where he made the acquaintance of Emmanuel Frémiet and Alexandre Falguière. In 1898, he paid a visit to Tunisia, joining Géza, who was there on a scholarship, sketching and painting lions. For the Exposition Universelle (1900), he was commissioned by the Ministry of Agriculture to create sculptures of Hungary's finest breeding animals. They were awarded a gold medal, and are now in the collection of the London Natural History Museum.

That same year, he married Olga Benczúr, daughter of the painter Gyula Benczúr. They had three children. Their daughter, Éva, and son, László also became sculptors. Their elder son, Pál, was killed in World War I.

In 1901, he was commissioned to create a statue of King Gábor Bethlen, one of his best known works, which is now in Hősök tere (Heroes' Square). Four years later, he contributed to the sculptural decorations at St. Stephen's Basilica. In 1909, he produced the Triton statue at the Széchenyi thermal baths. An equestrian statue of Francis II Rákóczi was installed in Szeged in 1912, but a similar statue of Grand Prince Árpád, for Munkács, was never completed due to the outbreak of the war. A small model may be seen at the Hungarian Agricultural Museum.

After the war, his commissions decreased. In 1931, he received a major one from Egypt, consisting of fifty statues of sheep, cattle and horses for a new agricultural museum there. The commission was completed together with his son, László. A statue of Artúr Görgei that he created in 1935, for Buda Castle, was destroyed in 1945 to provide materials for one of Stalin. Another statue there, of András Hadik. survived. A statue of the famous racehorse, Kincsem, commissioned in 1942, was destroyed in 1945, while still in his studio.

In addition to his monumental works, smaller statues and busts may be seen at the Hungarian National Gallery.

== Selected sculptures ==
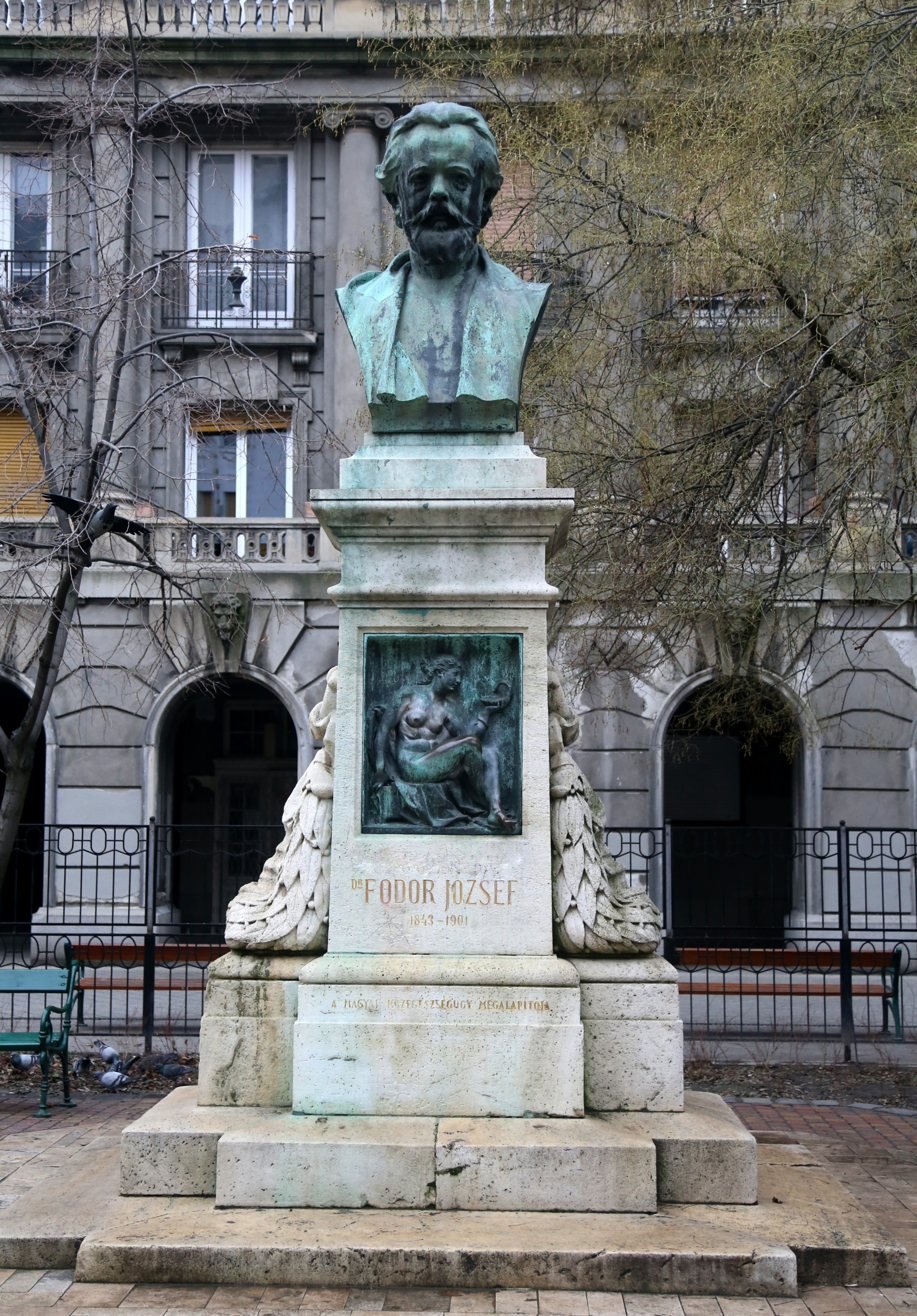
József Fodor

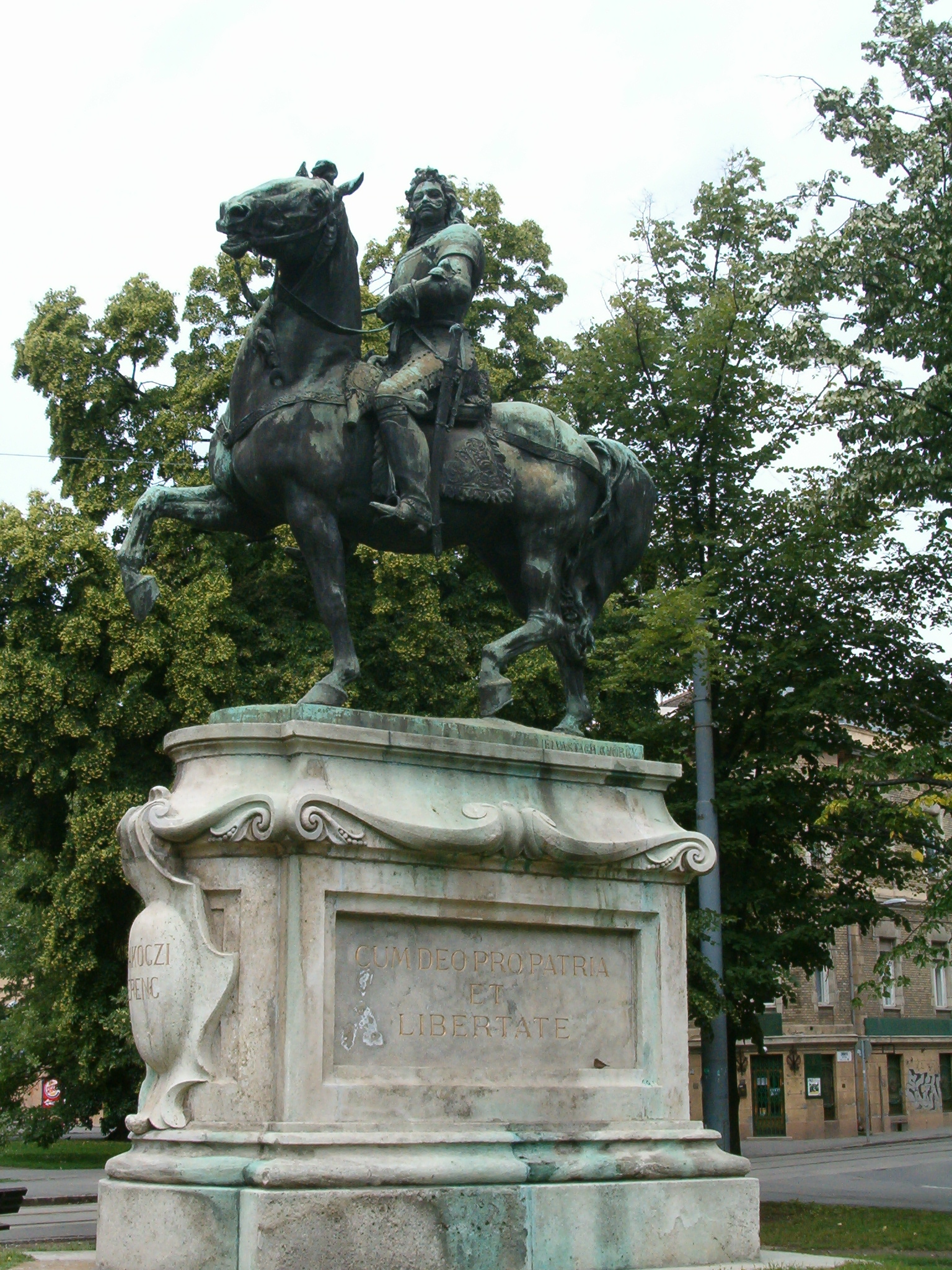
Francis II Rákóczi

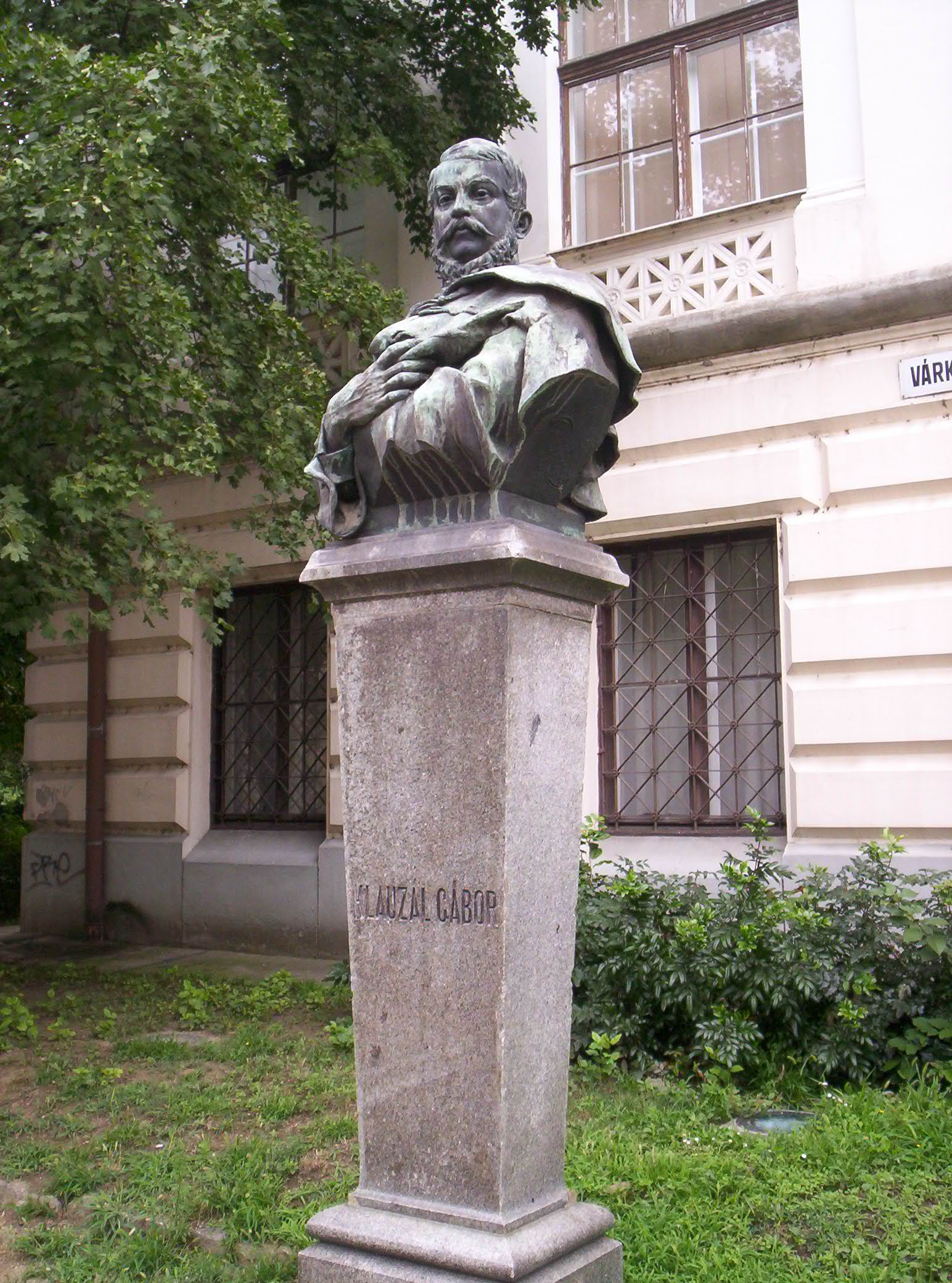
Gábor Klauzál

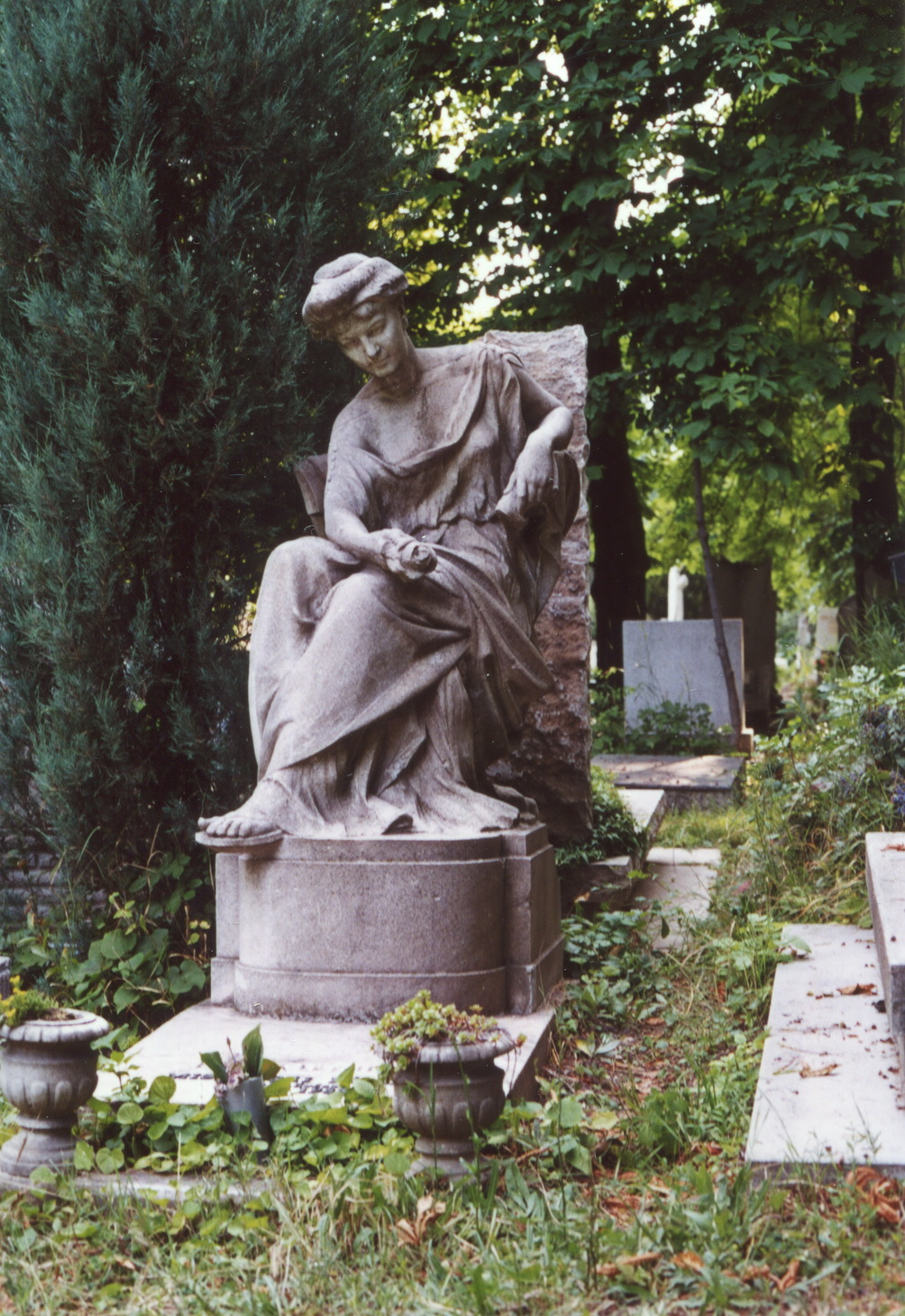
The Tomb of Ari

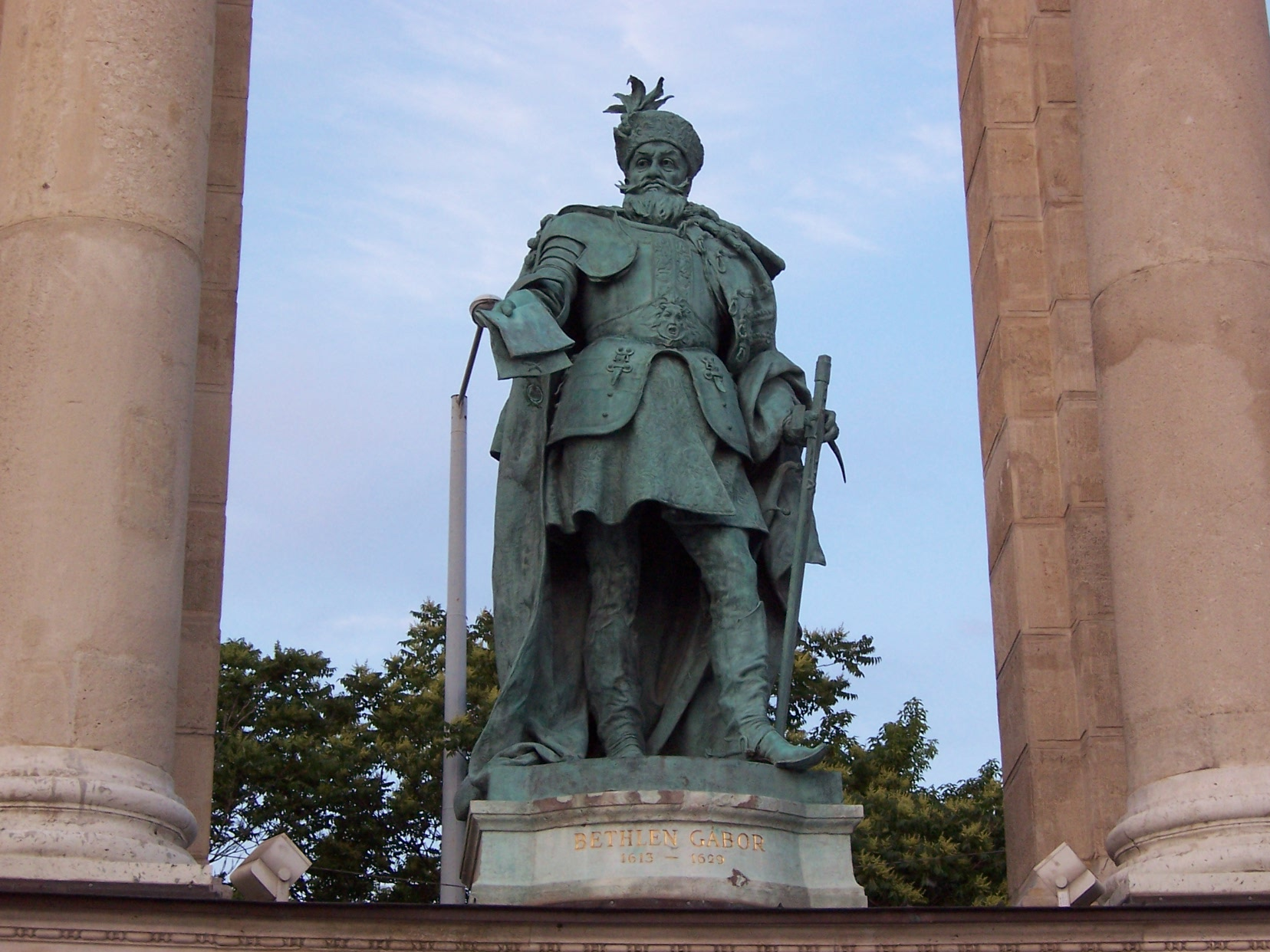
Gábor Bethlen

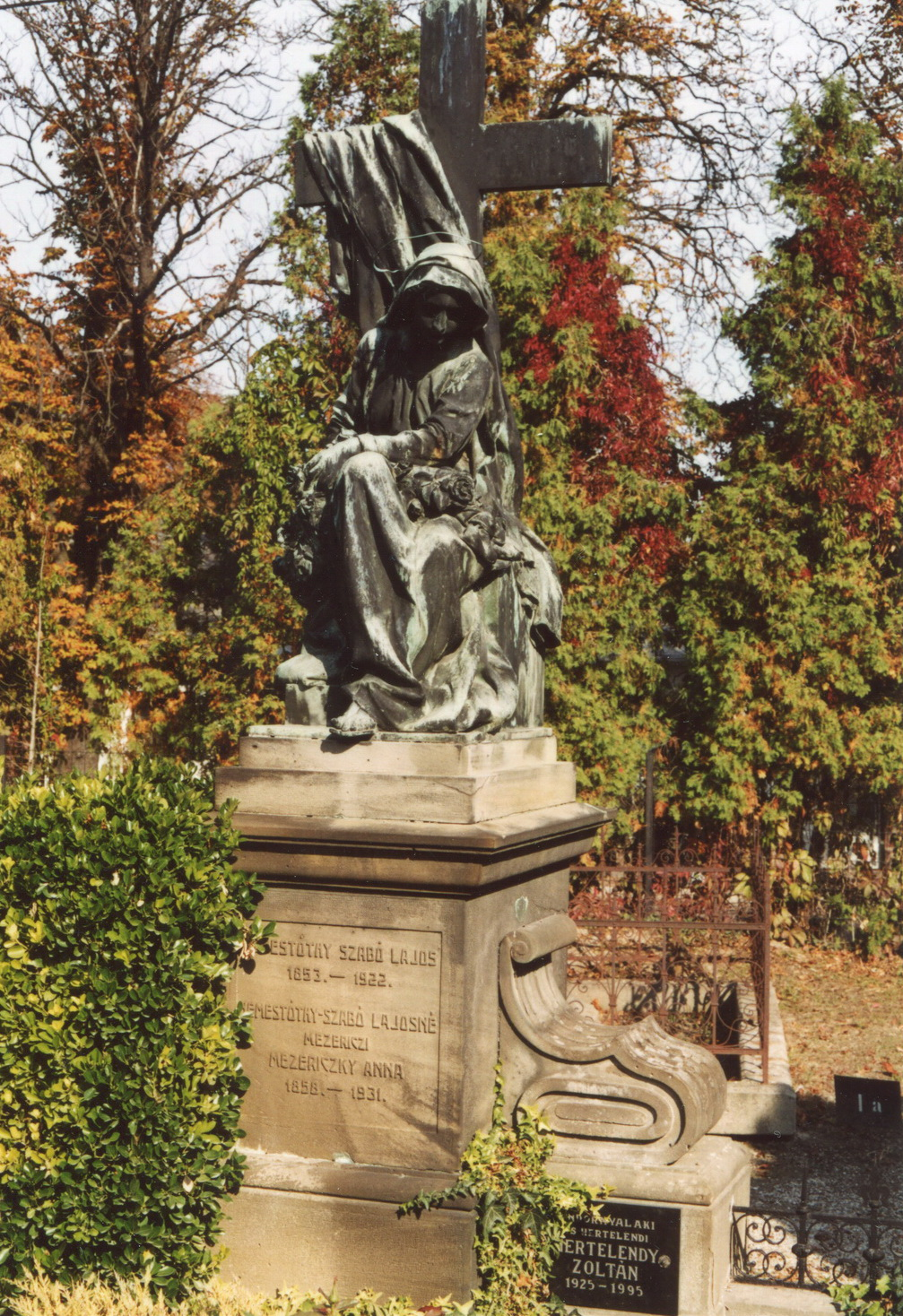
Tomb of the
Szabó family

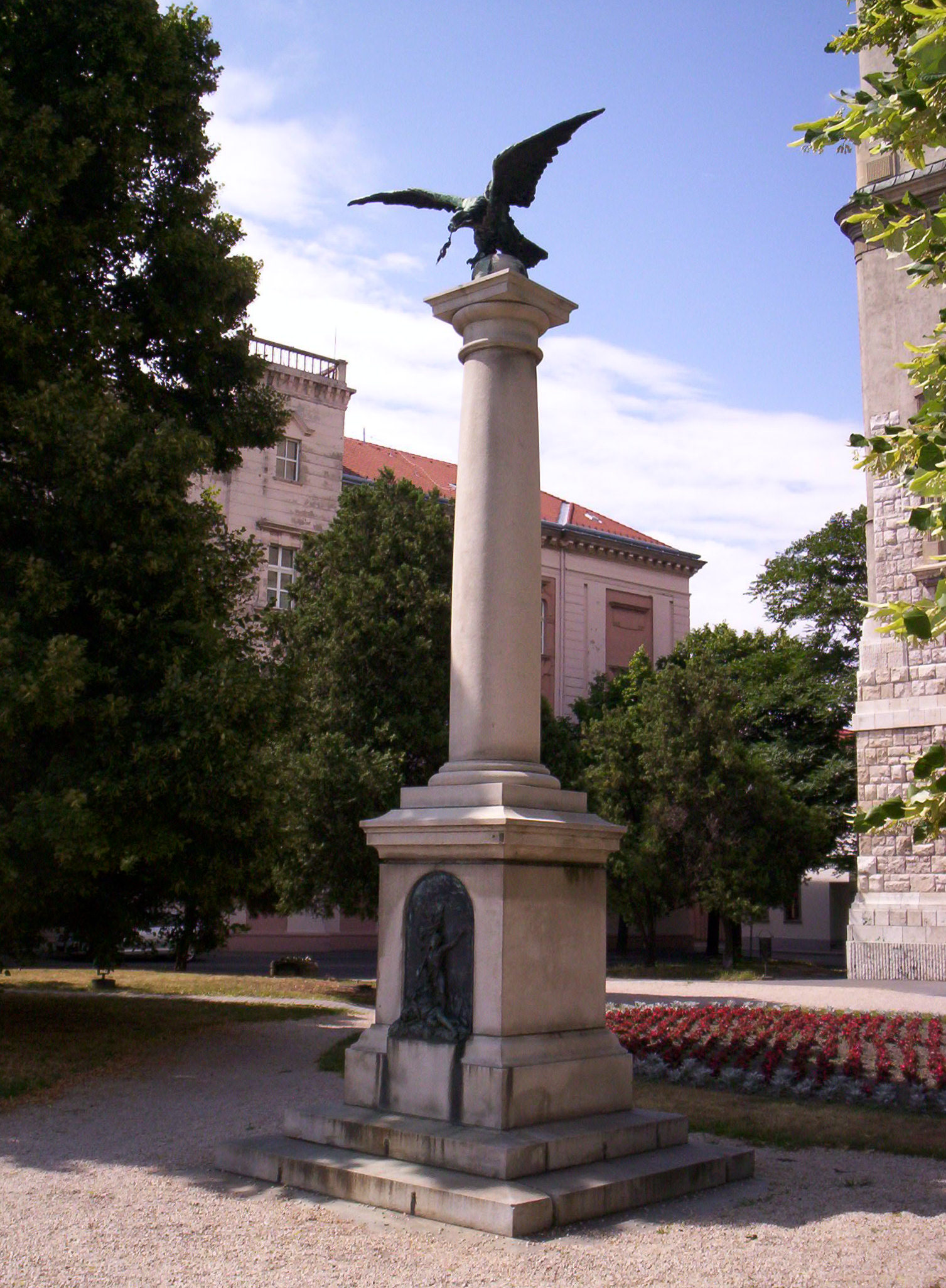
National Monument, Pápa

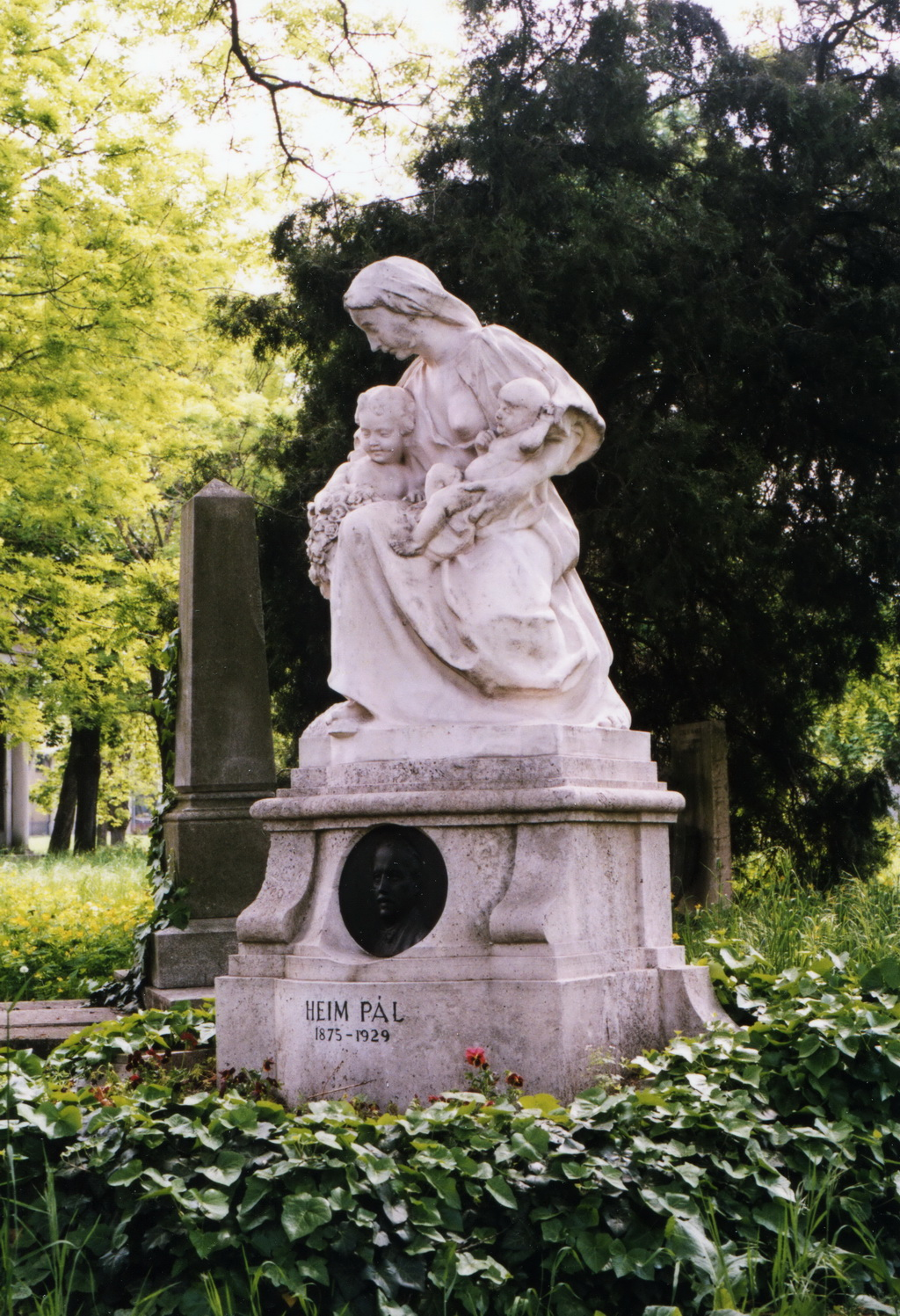
The Tomb of Pál Heim

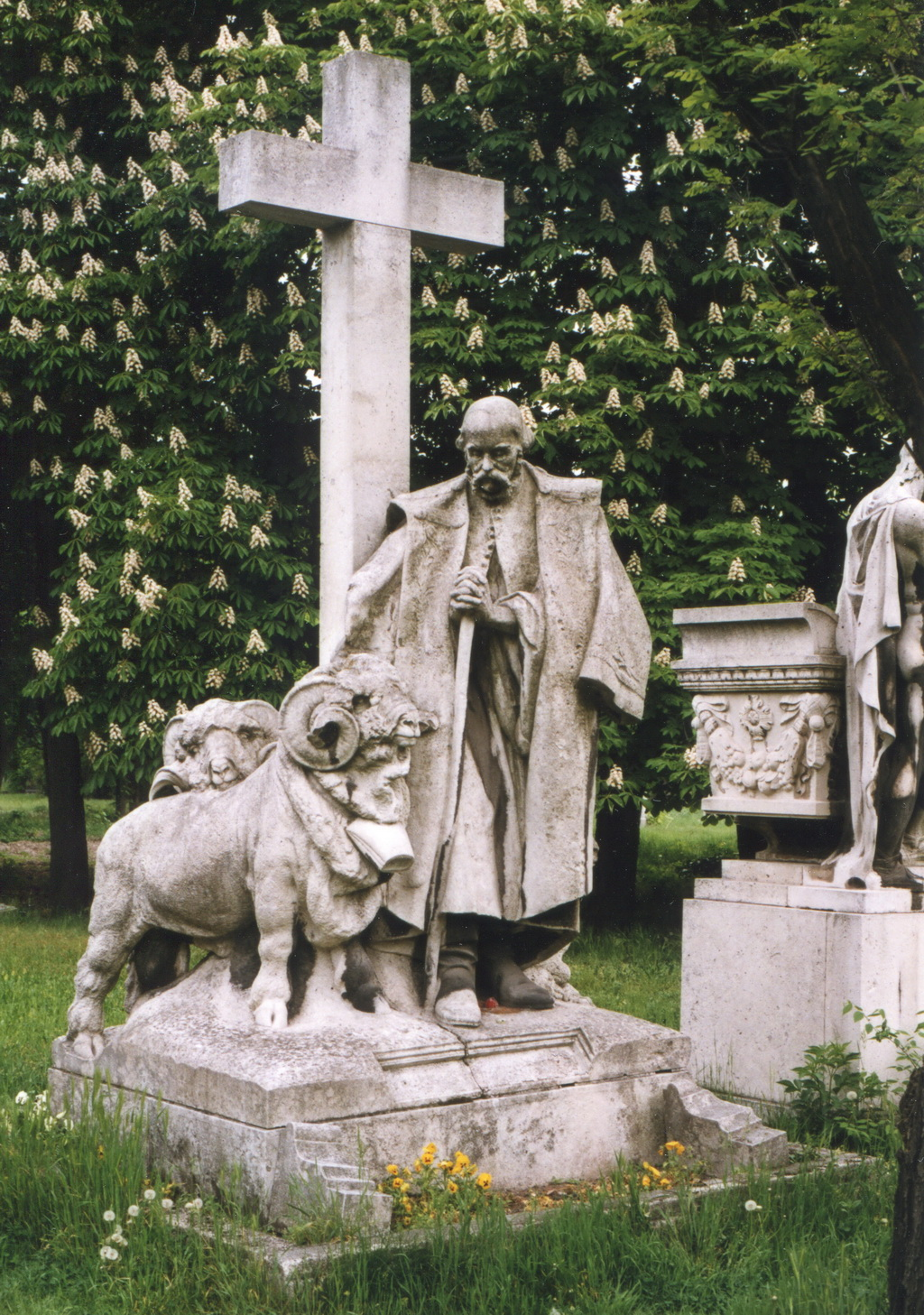
The Tomb of Béla Pállik

== Sources ==
- Török Zsófia: "Ifjabb Vastagh György". In: Magyar Agrártörténeti életrajzok (vol.3), Magyar Mezőgazdasági Múzeum, Budapest, 1989 ISBN 978-963-01-7833-4
- Csap Erzsébet: ifj. Vastagh György emlékkiállítás (memorial exhibition), Magyar Mezőgazdasági Múzeum, Budapest, 1968 (Online)
- Gecse Lászlóné: "ifj. Vastagh György magyar szürke szarvasmarha szobrai a Magyar Mezőgazdasági Múzeumban" (Sculptures of cattle at the Hungarian Agricultural Museum). In: Magyar Mezőgazdasági Múzeum Közleményei, 1984-1985, pp. 364-380 (Online)
- Csiffáry Gabriella (Ed.), Születtem...Magyar képzőművészek önéletrajzai (I Was Born...Curriculum Vitae of Hungarian Artists), Palatinus Kiadó, 2002 ISBN 963-9380-37-7
- Barla-Szabó László: A Vastagh művészcsalád (exhibition catalogue), Ernst Museum, 2004 ISBN 963-703-205-3
