= György Vastagh =

Hungarian painter (1834–1922)

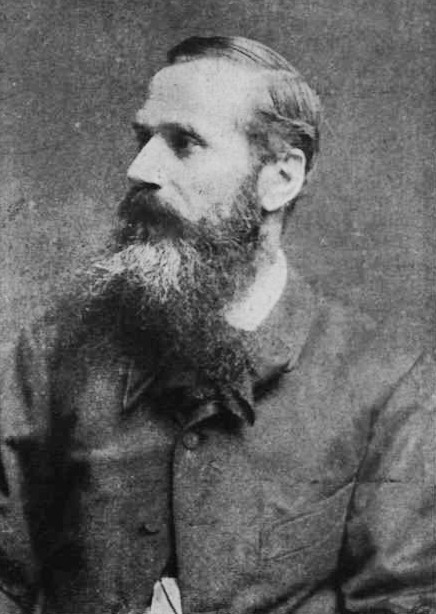
György Vastagh; photograph by the Károly Koller studios (1894)

György Vastagh (12 April 1834 in Szeged – 21 February 1922 in Budapest) was a Hungarian portrait and genre painter.

== Biography ==
His father was a shipping administrator, but had artistic leanings, which influenced György to start painting when he was still a boy. After returning home from fighting in the Hungarian Revolution, his talent was noticed by a piano teacher who lived nearby, and he began taking his first lessons from a local artist. In 1854 he went to Vienna, where he studied at the Academy of Fine Arts and came under the influence of Carl Rahl and Friedrich von Amerling. While there, he mostly produced portraits and religiously themed works.

In 1857, he settled in Kolozsvár, shared a studio with his friend, the photographer Ferenc Veress, and got married. At first, he still painted mostly portraits, but soon turned to genre scenes on rural subjects. He refused two offers of government scholarships (one from József Eötvös) because he did not want to feel obligated to the Alexander Bach administration. During this time, he made numerous visits to Vienna and began to participate in exhibitions there.

In 1876 he moved, this time taking his family to Budapest, where he set up a portrait studio that catered to aristocratic clientele. Among his sitters at that time were Lajos Kossuth, Emperor Franz Joseph I and the Emperor's wife Elisabeth. For almost three decades, he served as the court painter to the Archduke Joseph Karl Ludwig. In 1883, he painted a portion of the ceiling fresco in the foyer of the Hungarian State Opera. He also painted altarpieces in Budapest, Szeged, Arad and Temesvár.

In 1894, he became one of the founders of the "Magyar Művészek és Műpártolók Egyesülete" (Hungarian Association of Artists and Patrons) and shortly after helped to organize the National Salon for their exhibitions.

He was the first in what would become a family of artists. His eldest son Géza was also a painter, who specialized in animals, and his namesake son György was a sculptor. His grandchildren Éva and László were also sculptors.

== Selected paintings ==
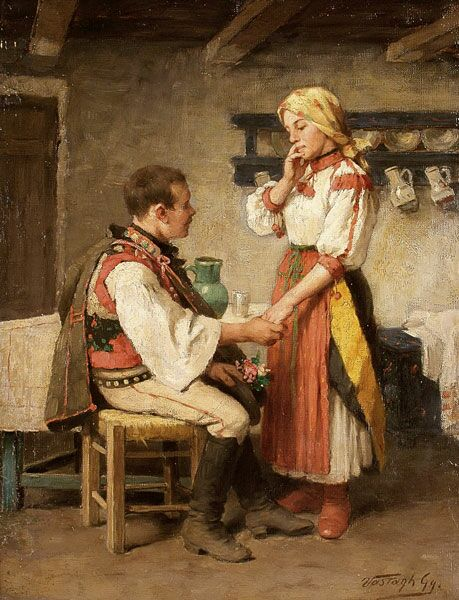
Courtship

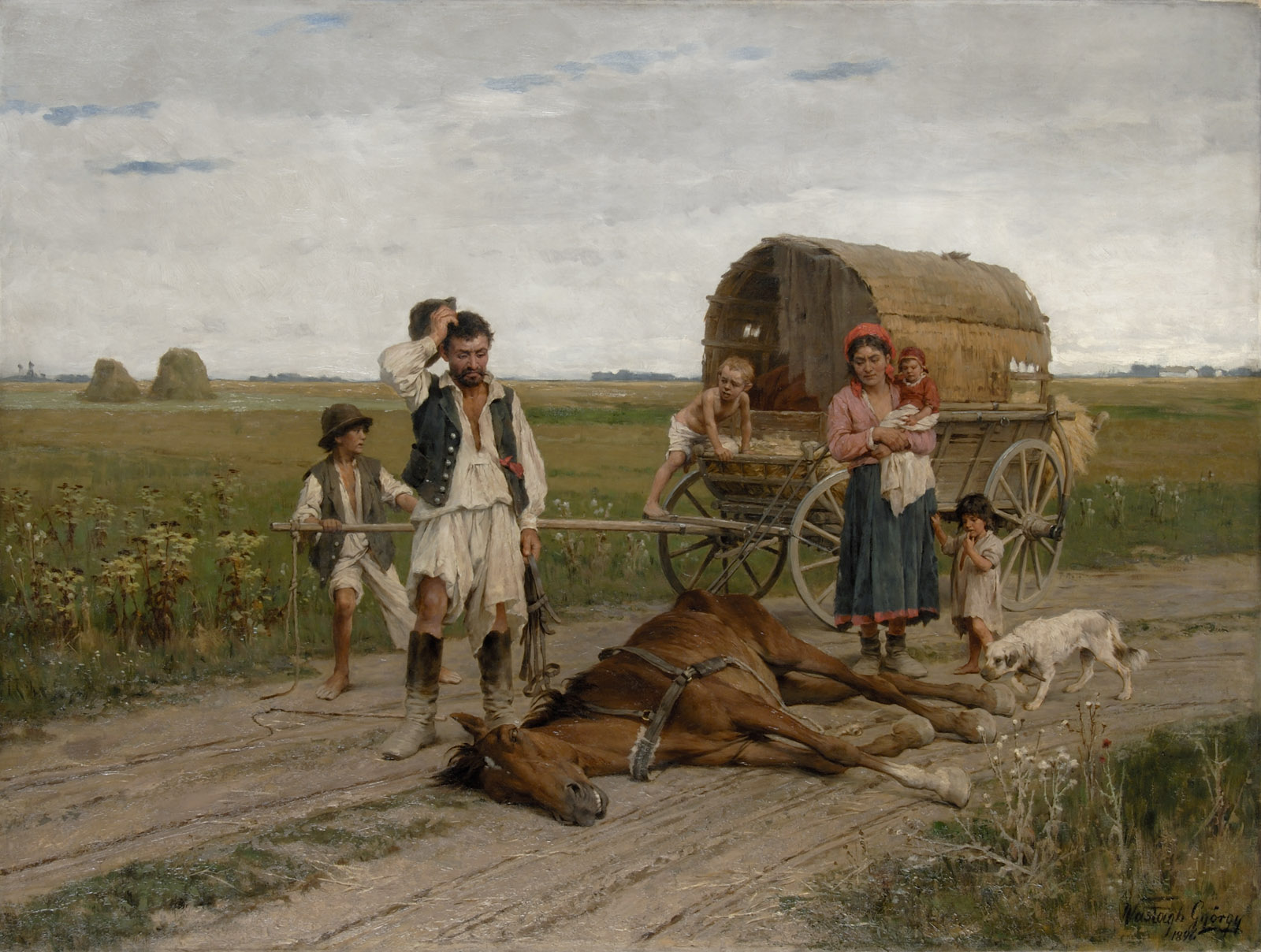
The Unfortunate Gypsies

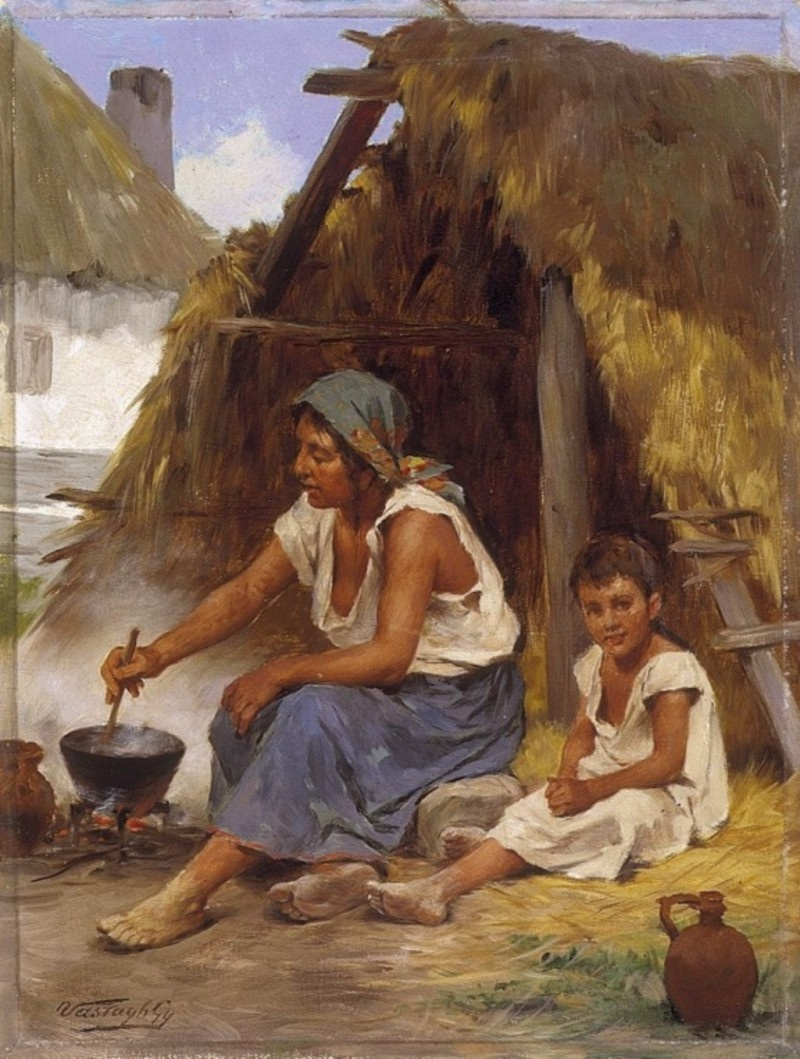
Dinner

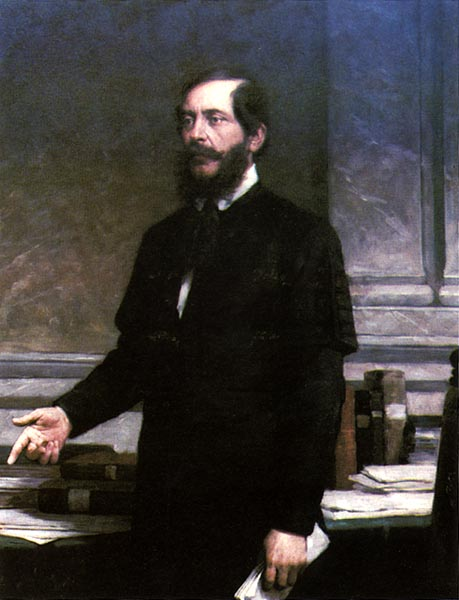
Portrait of Lajos Kossuth
