= Štefan Novák =

His Grace Štefan Novák
- Greek Catholic Eparchy of Prešov
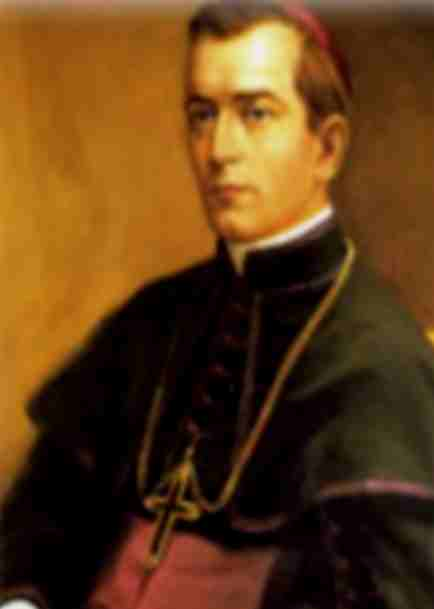
- Church: Slovak Greek Catholic Church
- Appointed: 20 November 1913
- Term ended: 1 October 1918
- Predecessor: Bishop Ján Vályi
- Successor: ThDr. Mikuláš Rusnák, Vicar General

Orders
- Ordination: 9 January 1905 by Bishop Julius Firczak
- Consecration: 11 January 1913 by Bishop Antal Papp

Personal details
- Born: 4 December 1879 Ubľa, Zemplín, Austria-Hungary
- Died: 5 September 1932 (aged 52) Budapest, Hungary

Štefan Novák (4 December 1879 – 5 September 1932) was a Greek Catholic hierarch who, from 1913 to 1918, served as the bishop of the Eparchy of Prešov (present-day Slovak Catholic Archeparchy of Prešov).

On 4 December 1879, he was born in Ubľa, Zemplín, Austria-Hungary (present-day Slovakia) as the son of a Rev. John Novak, a Greek Catholic priest. Despite being orphaned at a young age, he was supported by two clergymen during his secondary education, Canon Julius Drohobecky (later Bishop of the Eparchy of Križevci) and Chancellor Antal Papp (later Bishop of the Greek Catholic Eparchy of Mukachevo). Bishop Julius Firczak, seeing potential in the young student, decided to send him to the Latin Rite seminary in Esztergom to study theology.

After being ordained as a priest on 9 January 1905 at Holy Cross Cathedral in Uzhhorod, he continued his studies in Vienna, where in 1906 he graduated as a Doctor of Sacred Theology with high honors. Upon returning to Uzhhorod, he was appointed Prefect and Assistant Professor at the Greek Catholic Seminary. However, two years later, in 1908, he was released from his duties at the Seminary to become the personal tutor of Count Mauricius Palfy's children. The Count was in the diplomatic service in Rome and had the privilege of having great influence in Vatican circles.

When the Episcopal see in Prešov became vacant due to the death of Bishop Ján Vályi on 19 November 1911, it was Count Palfy who recommended that Štefan Novák be appointed as his successor. Thus, he was appointed as the Bishop of the Eparchy by the Holy See on 20 November 1913 at the age of 33 and then consecrated on 11 January 1914. The principal consecrator was Bishop Antal Papp, and the principal co-consecrator were Bishop Augustín Fischer-Colbrie and Bishop József Lányi de Késmark.

Bishop Novák resigned on 1 October 1918.

He died in Budapest on 5 September 1932.
