= Ivan Pasteliy =

Bishop of the Ruthenian Catholic Eparchy of Mukacheve from 1875 to 1891

- Bishop of Mukachevo
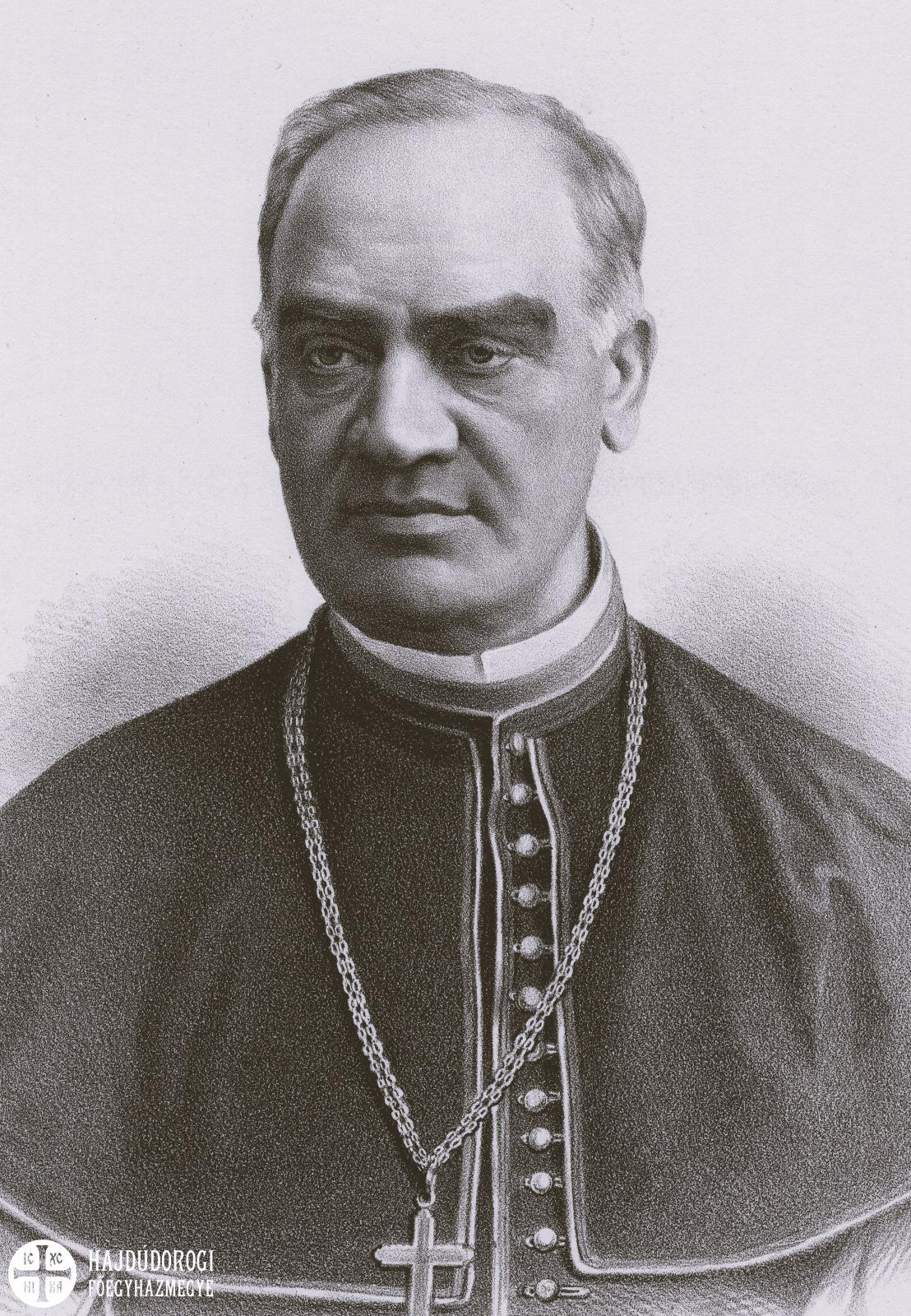
- Church: Ruthenian Greek Catholic Church
- Diocese: Eparchy of Mukachevo
- In office: 15 March 1875 – 24 March 1891
- Predecessor: Stefan Pankovych
- Successor: Yuliy Firtsak

Orders
- Ordination: 1 July 1849
- Consecration: 18 April 1875 by Jozef Gaganec

Personal details
- Born: 8 May 1826 Velejte, Kingdom of Hungary, Austrian Empire
- Died: 24 March 1891 (aged 64) Ungvár, Kingdom of Hungary, Transleithania, Austria-Hungary

Ivan Pasteliy (Ukrainian: Іван Пастелій; 8 May 1826 – 24 March 1891) was a Ruthenian Greek Catholic hierarch. He was bishop of the Ruthenian Catholic Eparchy of Mukacheve from 1875 to 1891.

Born in Veljatin, Austrian Empire (present day – Slovakia) in 1826, he was ordained a priest on 1 July 1849. He was confirmed as the Bishop by the Holy See on 15 March 1875. He was consecrated to the Episcopate on 18 April 1875. The principal consecrator was Bishop Jozef Gaganec.

He died in Uzhhorod on 24 March 1891.

Catholic Church titles
Preceded by Stefan Pankovych	Ruthenian Catholic Bishop of Mukacheve; 1875–1891	Succeeded by Yuliy Firtsak
