= Vyšný Tvarožec =

- Municipality
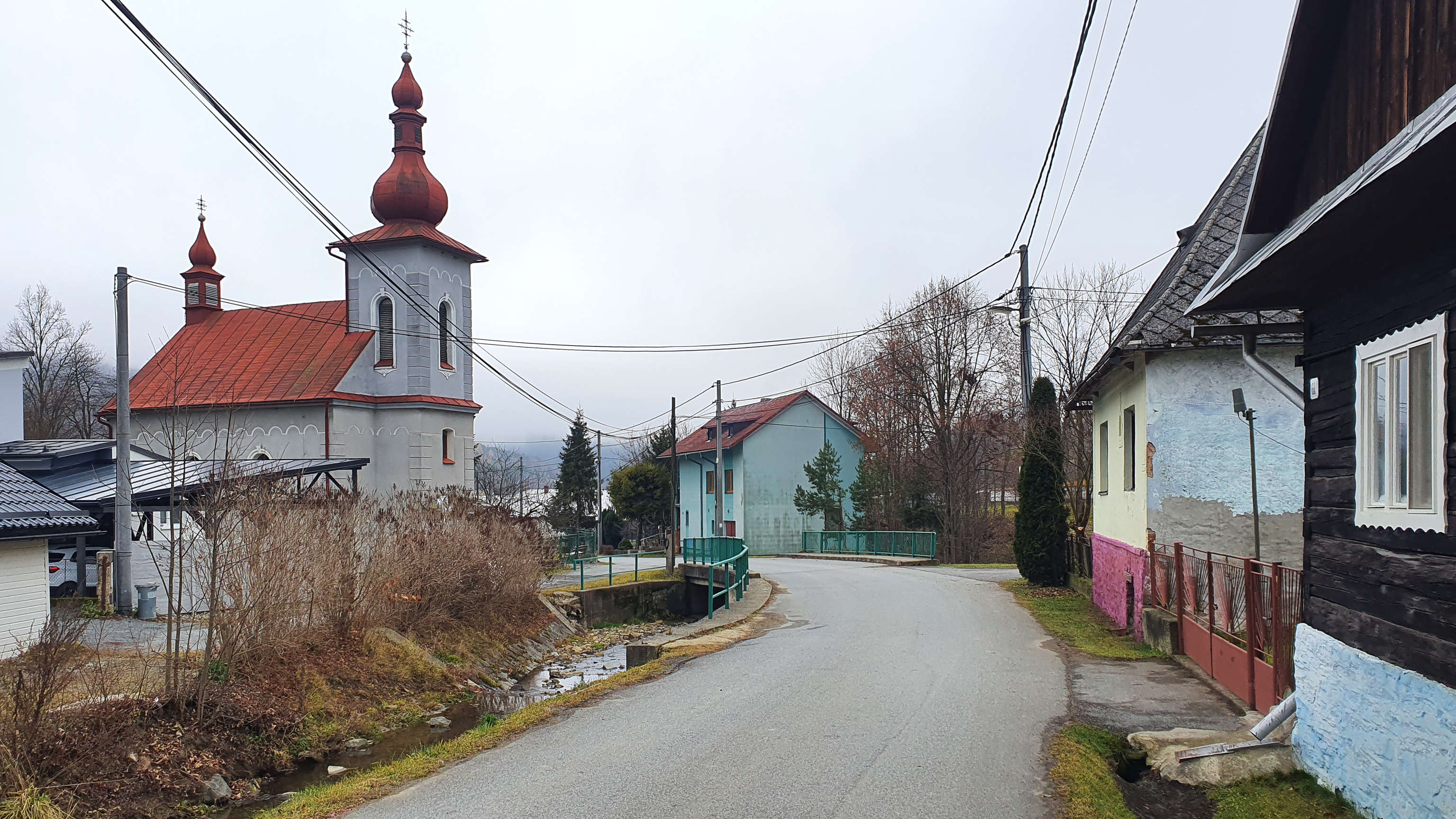

- Flag

- Location of Vyšný Tvarožec in the Prešov Region Location of Vyšný Tvarožec in Slovakia
- Coordinates: 49.38°N 21.20°E
- Country: Slovakia
- Region: Prešov Region
- District: Bardejov District
- First mentioned: 1414

Area
  - Total: 8.21 km^{2} (3.17 sq mi)
- Elevation: 495 m (1,624 ft)

Population (2025)
  - Total: 120
- Time zone: UTC+1 (CET)
  - Summer (DST): UTC+2 (CEST)
- Postal code: 860 2
- Area code: +421 54
- Vehicle registration plate (until 2022): BJ
- Website: www.vysnytvarozec.eu

Vyšný Tvarožec (Rusyn: Вышнїй Тварожець, Ukrainian: Вишній Тварожець, Hungarian: Felsőtaróc) is a village and municipality in Bardejov District in the Prešov Region of north-east Slovakia.

== History ==
In historical records, the village is first mentioned in 1414.

== Geography ==
The municipality lies at an altitude of 495 metres (1,624 ft) and covers an area of 8.21 km^{2} (3.17 sq mi) (2025).

== Population ==
Population statistic (10 years)
Year	1995	2005	2015	2025
Count	129	135	123	120
Difference		+4.65%	−8.88%	−2.43%

Population statistic
Year	2024	2025
Count	122	120
Difference		−1.63%

It has a population of 120 people (31 December 2025).

=== Ethnicity ===
Census 2021 (1+ %)
Ethnicity	Number	Fraction
Slovak	94	77.68%
Rusyn	63	52.06%
Ukrainian	3	2.47%
Russian	3	2.47%
Total	121	

In year 2021 was 121 people by ethnicity 94 as Slovak, 63 as Rusyn, 3 as Ukrainian, 3 as Russian and 1 as English.

Note on population: The difference values of population numbers in the table "Population statistic" and in the sections "Ethnicity" & "Religion" is caused by the use of various statistical methods.

=== Religion ===
Census 2021 (1+ %)
Religion	Number	Fraction
Greek Catholic Church	94	77.69%
Eastern Orthodox Church	16	13.22%
Roman Catholic Church	6	4.96%
None	4	3.31%
Total	121	

In year 2021 was 121 people by religion 94 from Greek Catholic Church, 16 from Eastern Orthodox Church, 6 from Roman Catholic Church, 4 from None and 1 from Evangelical Church.
