= Kobylnice (Mladá Boleslav District) =

- Municipality
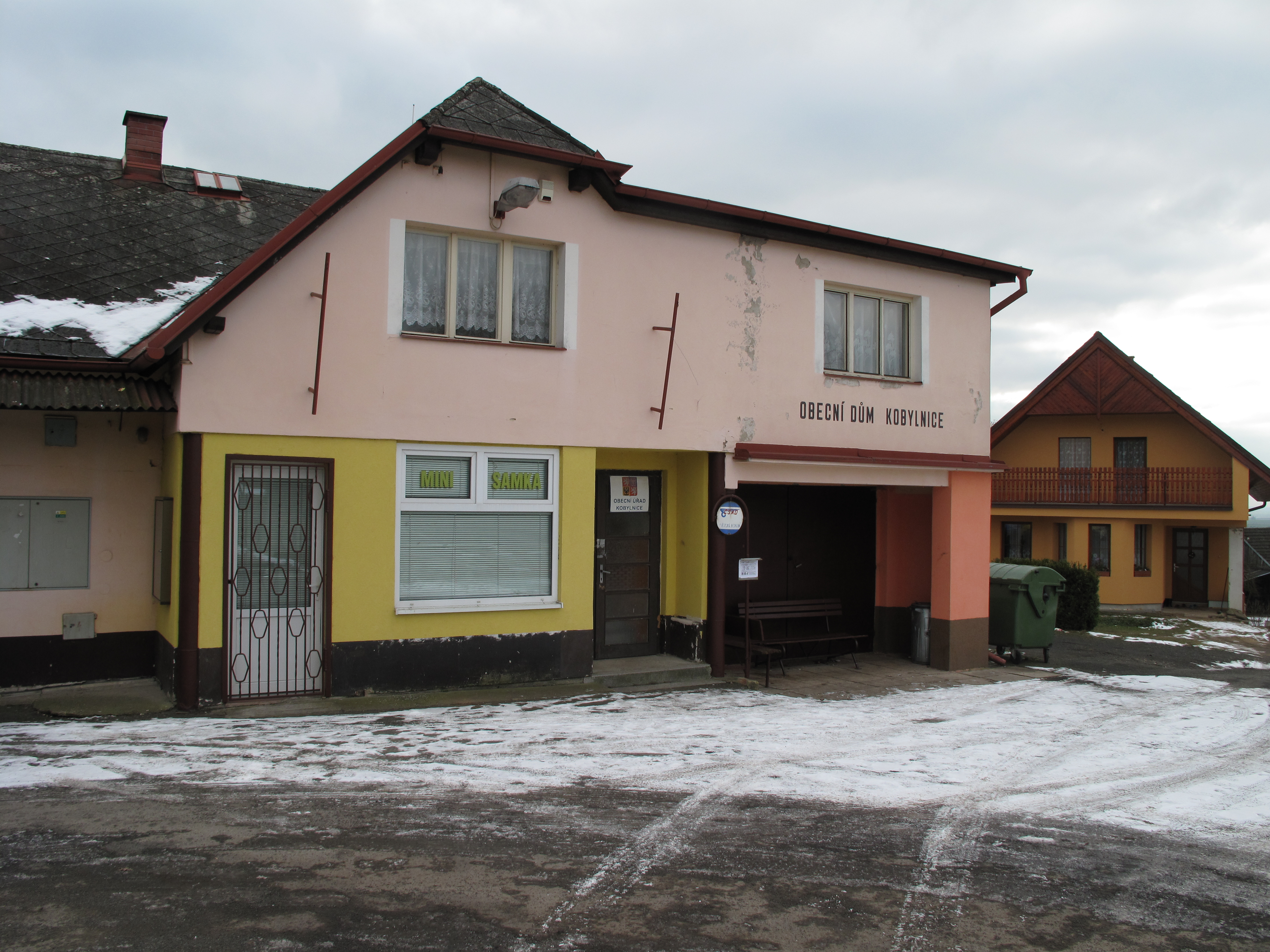
- Municipal office

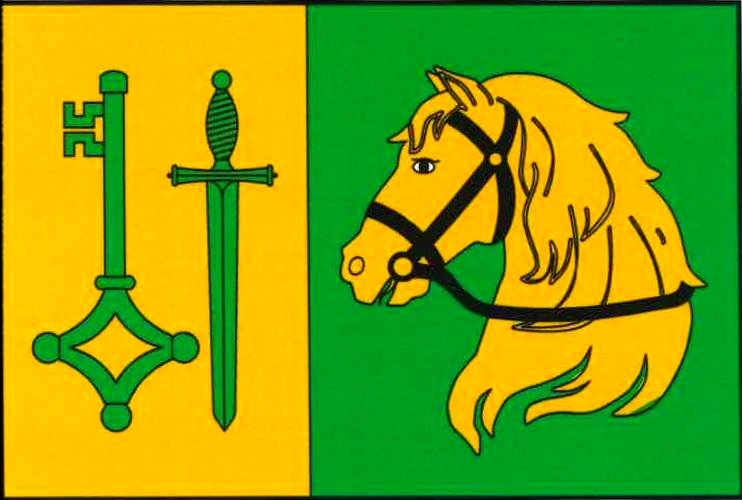
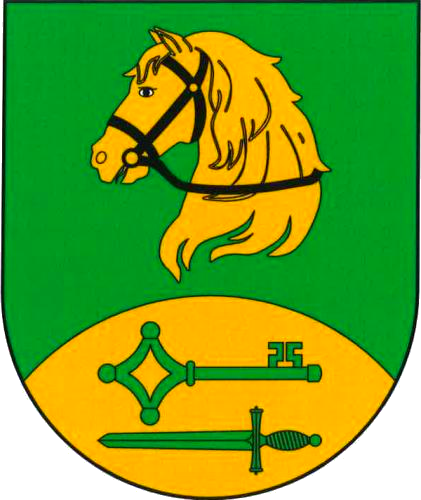
- Flag Coat of arms

- Location in the Czech Republic
- Coordinates: 50°22′18″N 15°3′14″E
- Country: Czech Republic
- Region: Central Bohemian
- District: Mladá Boleslav
- First mentioned: 1227

Area
  - Total: 2.10 km^{2} (0.81 sq mi)
- Elevation: 291 m (955 ft)

Population (2026-01-01)
  - Total: 168
  - Density: 80.0/km^{2} (207/sq mi)
- Time zone: UTC+1 (CET)
  - Summer (DST): UTC+2 (CEST)
- Postal code: 294 46
- Website: www.obeckobylnice.cz

Kobylnice is a municipality and village in Mladá Boleslav District in the Central Bohemian Region of the Czech Republic. It has about 200 inhabitants.

== Demographics ==
Historical population
Year	Pop.	±%
1869	165	—
1880	163	−1.2%
1890	151	−7.4%
1900	142	−6.0%
1910	160	+12.7%
1921	150	−6.2%
1930	147	−2.0%
1950	94	−36.1%
1961	83	−11.7%
1970	73	−12.0%
1980	59	−19.2%
1991	54	−8.5%
2001	68	+25.9%
2011	125	+83.8%
2021	154	+23.2%
Source: Censuses
