= Kobylnice (Svidník District) =

Village in Slovakia

- Municipality
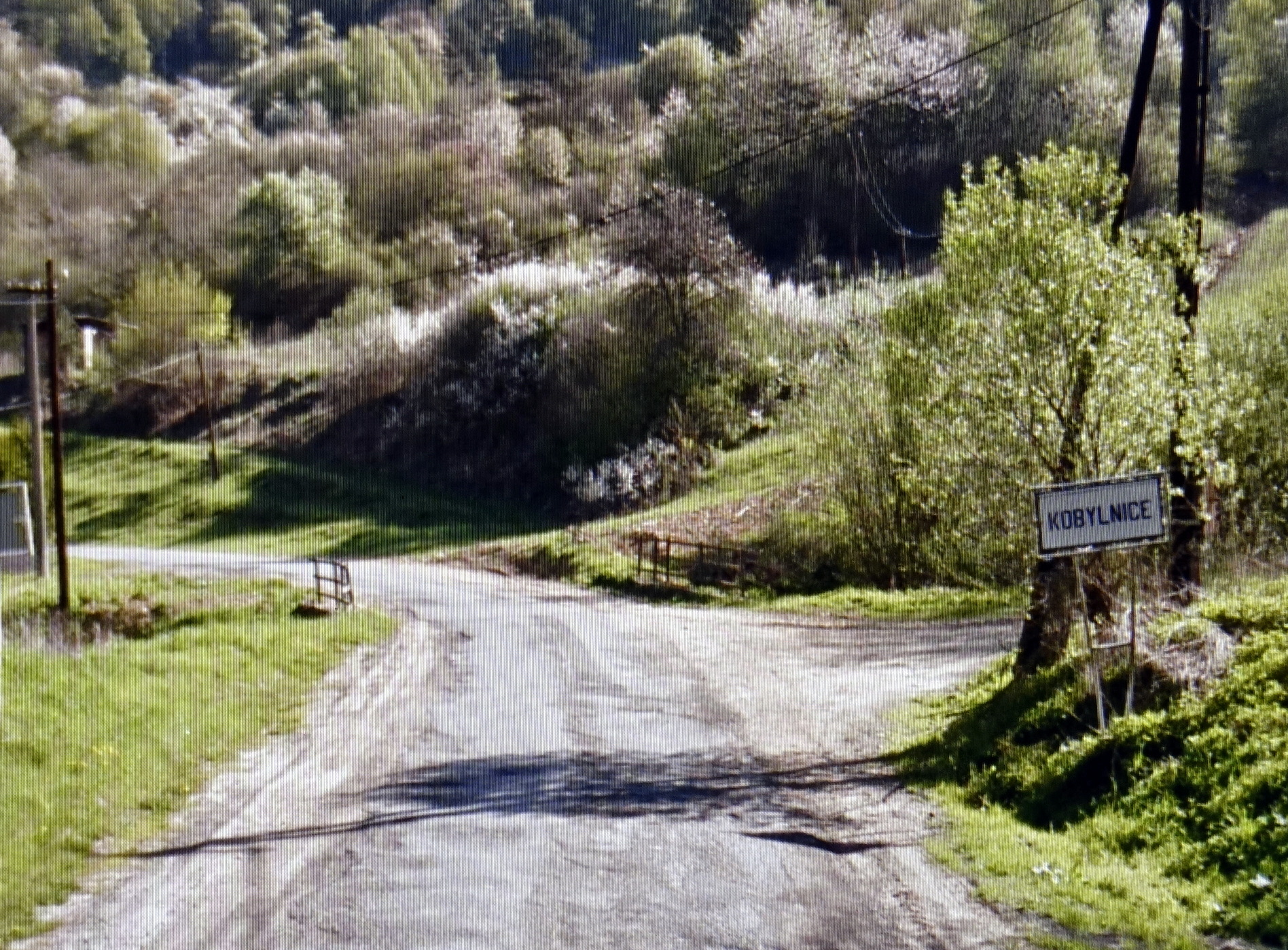

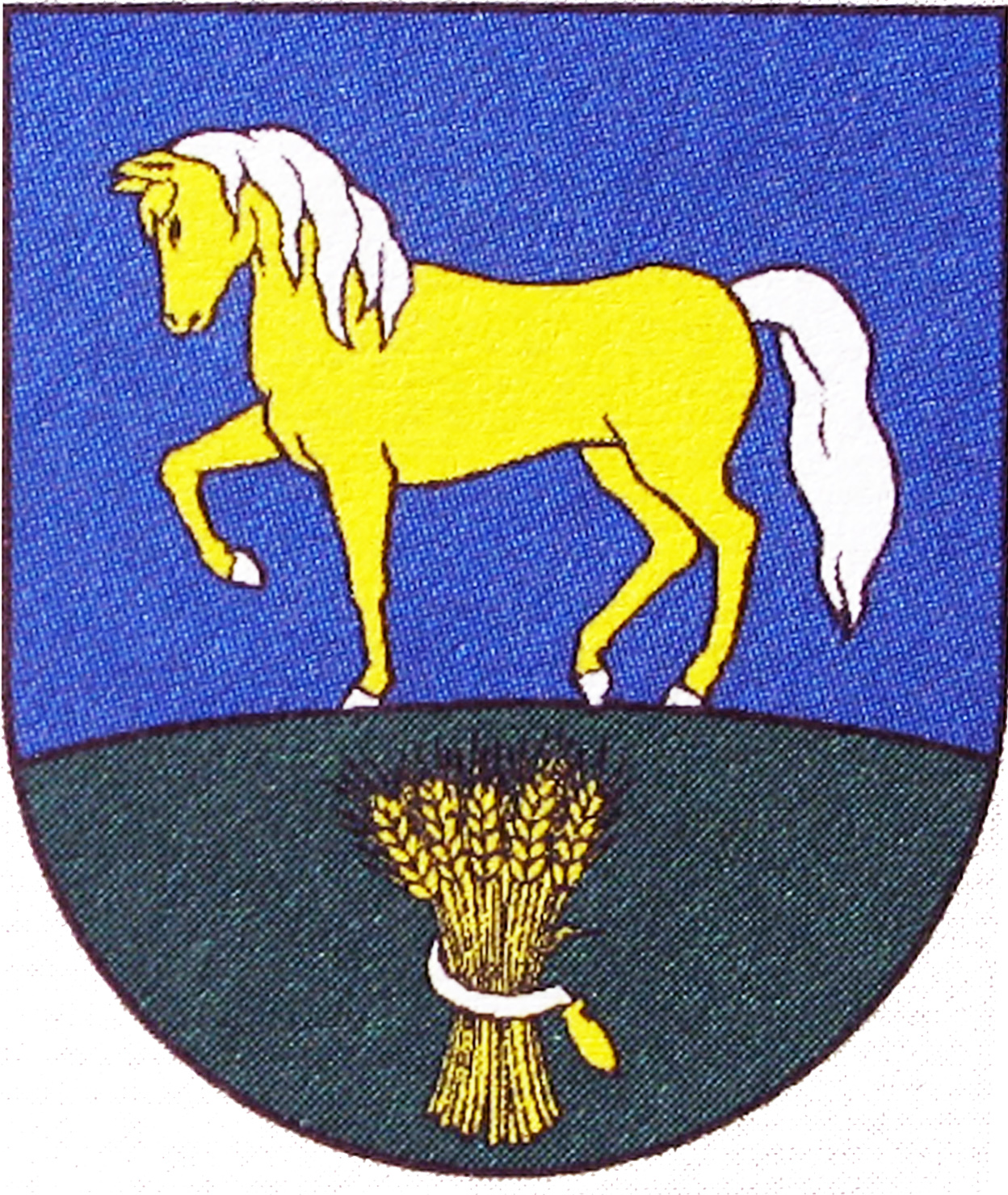
- Flag Coat of arms

- Location of Kobylnice in the Prešov Region Location of Kobylnice in Slovakia
- Coordinates: 49°06′N 21°33′E
- Country: Slovakia
- Region: Prešov Region
- District: Svidník District
- First mentioned: 1363

Area
  - Total: 10.42 km^{2} (4.02 sq mi)
- Elevation: 209 m (686 ft)

Population (2025)
  - Total: 87
- Time zone: UTC+1 (CET)
  - Summer (DST): UTC+2 (CEST)
- Postal code: 870 1
- Area code: +421 54
- Vehicle registration plate (until 2022): SK
- Website: www.obeckobylnice.sk

Kobylnice (Hungarian: Kabalás; Rusyn: Кобылницї) is a village and municipality in Svidník District in the Prešov Region of north-eastern Slovakia.

== History ==
In historical records the village was first mentioned in 1363. Kobylnice is the (somewhat disputed) birthplace of Saint Alexis Toth (1854–1909).

== Geography ==
The municipality lies at an altitude of 209 metres (686 ft) and covers an area of 10.42 km^{2} (4.02 sq mi) (2025).

== Population ==
Population statistic (10 years)
Year	1995	2005	2015	2025
Count	106	108	99	87
Difference		+1.88%	−8.33%	−12.12%

Population statistic
Year	2024	2025
Count	85	87
Difference		+2.35%

It has a population of 87 people (31 December 2025).

=== Ethnicity ===
Census 2021 (1+ %)
Ethnicity	Number	Fraction
Slovak	86	95.55%
Rusyn	14	15.55%
Not found out	3	3.33%
Total	90	

In year 2021 was 90 people by ethnicity 86 as Slovak, 14 as Rusyn and 3 as Not found out.

Note on population: The difference values of population numbers in the table "Population statistic" and in the sections "Ethnicity" & "Religion" is caused by the use of various statistical methods.

=== Religion ===
Census 2021 (1+ %)
Religion	Number	Fraction
Greek Catholic Church	78	86.67%
Roman Catholic Church	7	7.78%
Not found out	3	3.33%
None	2	2.22%
Total	90	

In year 2021 was 90 people by religion 78 from Greek Catholic Church, 7 from Roman Catholic Church, 3 from Not found out and 2 from None.

== Genealogical resources ==
The records for genealogical research are available at the state archive "Statny Archiv in Presov, Slovakia"

- Roman Catholic church records (births/marriages/deaths): 1776–1897 (parish B)
- Greek Catholic church records (births/marriages/deaths): 1862–1933 (parish A)

== See also ==
- List of municipalities and towns in Slovakia
