= Jozef Gaganec =

- Bishop of Prešov
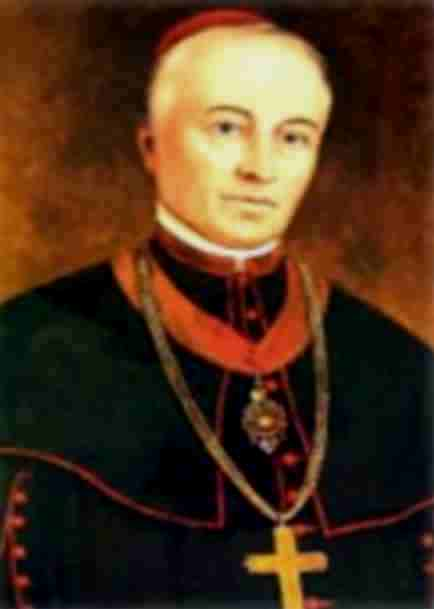
- Church: Ruthenian Greek Catholic Church
- Diocese: Eparchy of Prešov
- In office: 30 January 1843 – 22 December 1875
- Predecessor: Gregor Tarkovič
- Successor: Mikuláš Tóth

Orders
- Ordination: 8 March 1817 by Samuil Vulcan
- Consecration: 25 June 1843 by Vasyl Popovych

Personal details
- Born: 25 March 1793 Felsőtaróc, Sáros County, Kingdom of Hungary, Habsburg Realm
- Died: 22 December 1875 (aged 82) Prešov, Kingdom of Hungary, Transleithania, Austria-Hungary

Jozef Gaganec (25 March 1793 – 22 December 1875) was a Rusyn Greek Catholic hierarch. He was the bishop of Slovak Catholic Eparchy of Prešov from 1843 to 1875.

Born in Vyšný Tvarožec, Austrian Empire (present day – Slovakia) in the Ruthenian family in 1793, he was ordained a priest on 8 March 1817 for the Ruthenian Catholic Eparchy of Mukacheve. He was confirmed as the Bishop of Eparchy by the Holy See on 30 January 1843. He was consecrated to the Episcopate on 25 June 1843. The principal consecrator was Bishop Vasyl Popovych, and the principal co-consecrators were Archbishop Aristaces Azarian and Bishop Johann Michael Leonhard.

He died in Prešov on 22 December 1875.

Catholic Church titles
Preceded by Gregor Tarkovič	Slovak Catholic Eparchy of Prešov; 1843–1875	Succeeded by Mikuláš Tóth
