= Ferenc Veress =

Hungarian photographer and inventor (1832–1916)

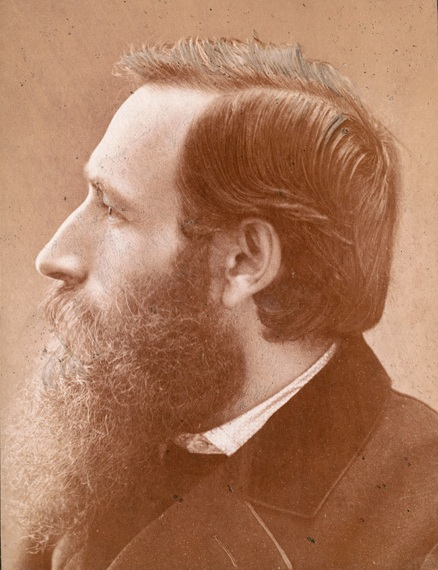
Self-portrait (1880)

Ferenc Veress (1 September 1832, Kolozsvár – 3 April 1916, Kolozsvár) was a Hungarian photographer and inventor.

== Biography ==
He became involved in photography through Baron Károly Apor, an amateur daguerreotypist, whose wife was related to wife. His first solo album featured portraits of notable Transylvanian people.

In 1852, he opened his own studio in Kolozsvár. It soon became a gathering place for members of the local creative community; such as the writer, Mór Jókai, the painter, Mihály Munkácsy, the scholar, Sámuel Brassai and the poet, Márton Debreczeni. In 1858, he opened a joint art and photography studio with his friend, the painter György Vastagh.

He wrote an article in 1862, for the magazine Ország Tükre (roughly: "Reflections on the Nation"), suggesting that daguerreotypes should be preserved in museums. Three years later, he became an official photographer for the Transylvanian Museum Association, but it wasn't until 1874 that the Hungarian National Museum made photographs a part of their collection. In 1880, the first photography exhibition took place at the Hall of Art, Budapest. The following year, he became a lecturer in photography at the local university. He began publishing a magazine in 1882, Fényképészeti Lapok (Photographic Journal), with financial support from his old mentor, Baron Apor. It was published until 1888.

By 1890, he was in financial trouble and was forced to rent part of his studio. Five years later, he made an appeal to what were then over 400 photographers in Hungary; to capture the landscapes, buildings and famous people of their country and establish a single, national collection. He attempted to enlist the help of the railways in providing free transportation for the project, but was unsuccessful, and the photographic societies remained indifferent, so he proposed setting up a "Photographers' Cooperative".

By 1897, he had given up his studio entirely, although he continued the experiments with color that he had been conducting since 1881. His last known photographs date from 1911. His son, Zoltán, became a well known painter.

== Selected photographs ==
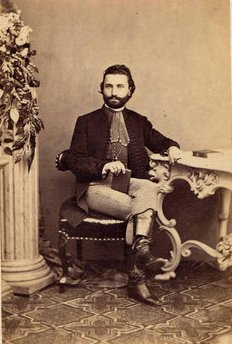
The operatic tenor, Pauli Richárd

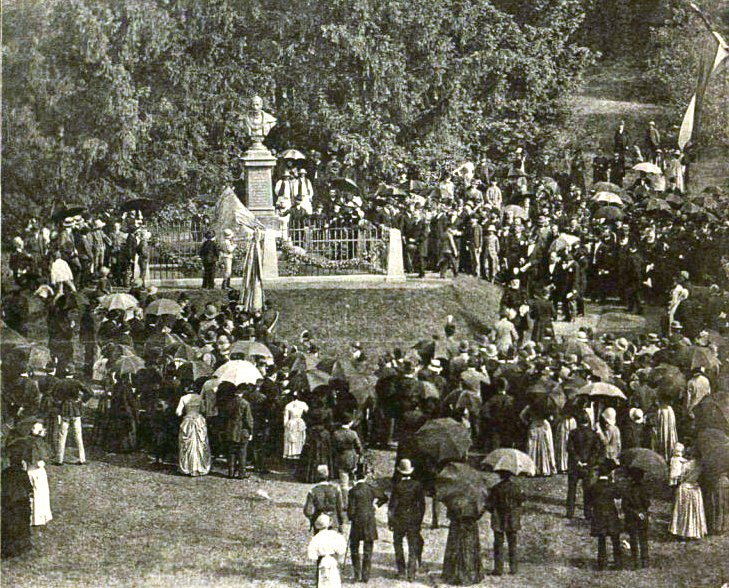
Unveiling a monument to Imre Mikó

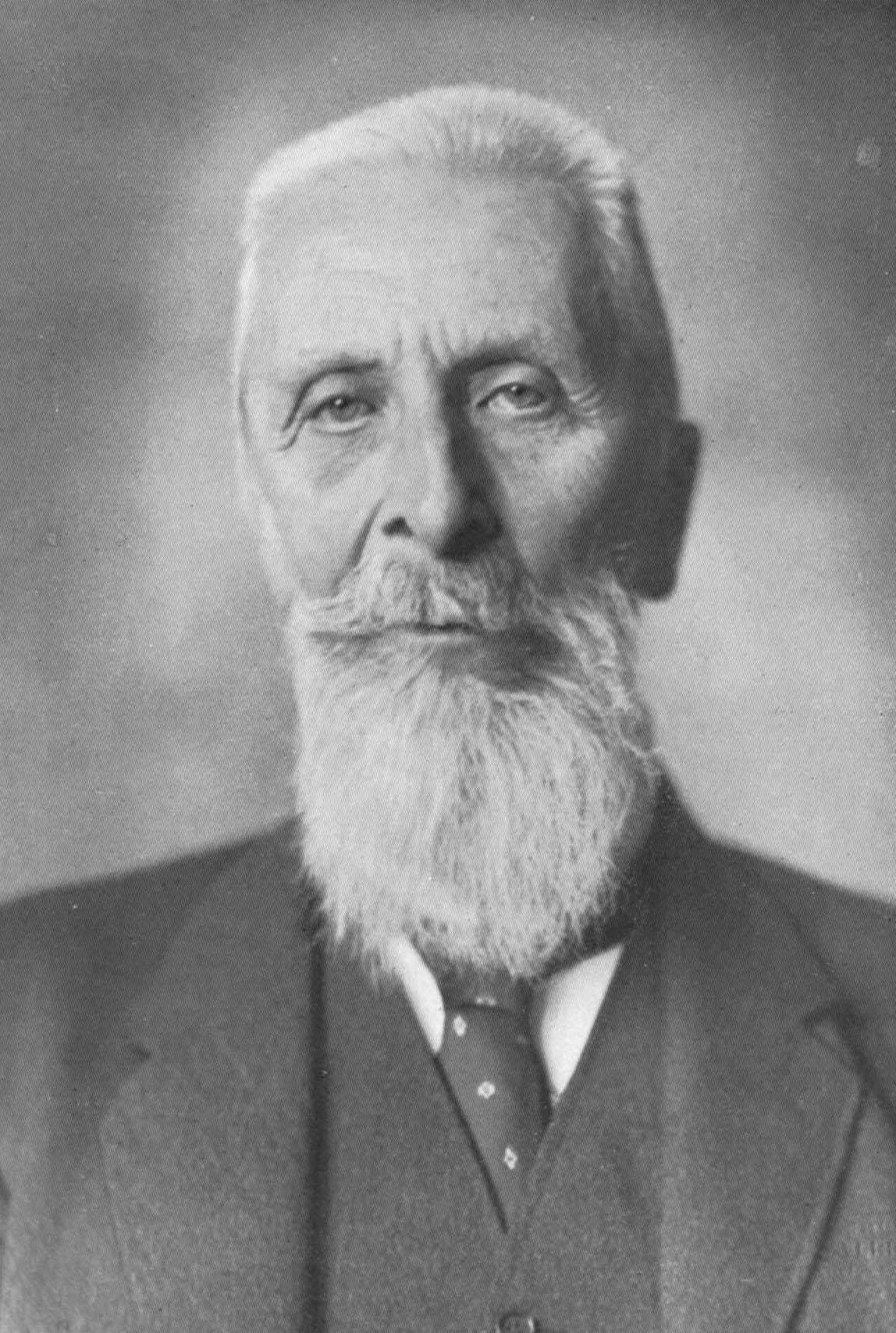
Albert Apponyi

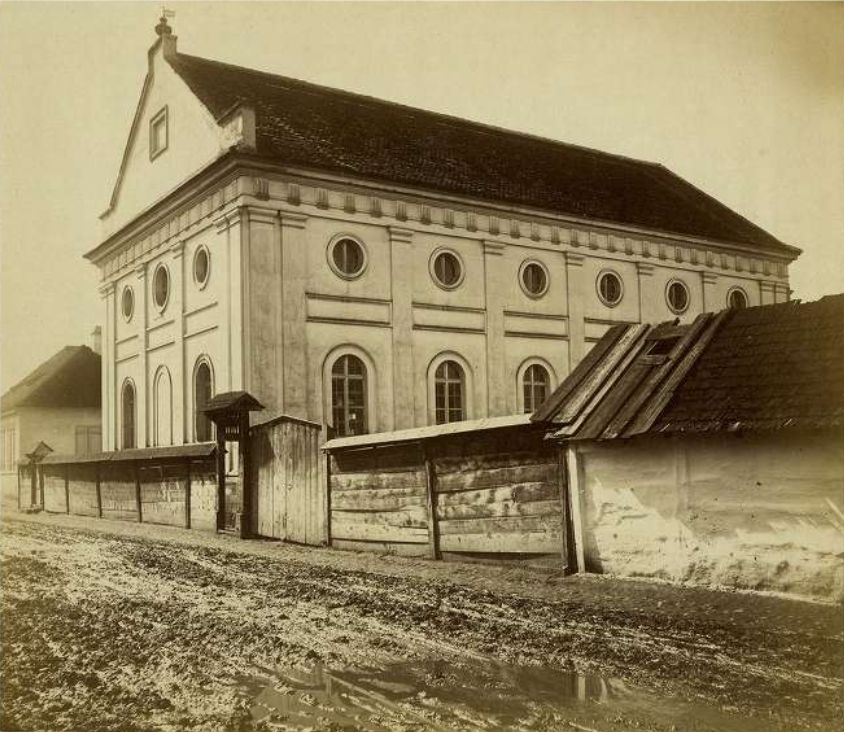
The Orthodox Synagogue

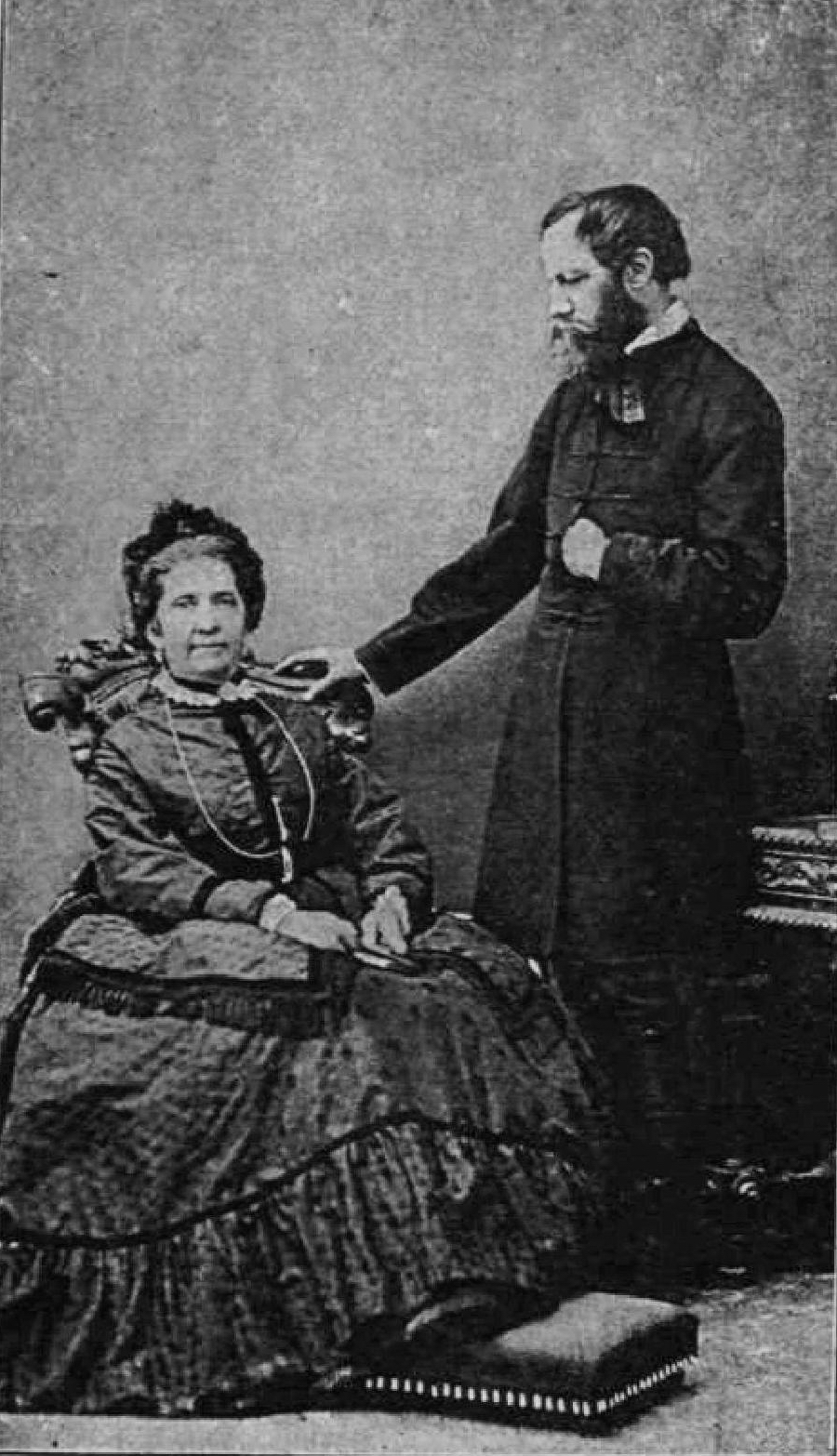
Mór Jókai and
his wife, Róza

== Sources ==
- Kincses Károly: Levétetett Veressnél, Kolozsvárt (Taken by Veress, exhibition catalog), Magyar Fotográfiai Múzeum, 1993
- Sas Péter: A Szamos-parti Athén, A 19. századi Kolozsvár és lakói Veress Ferenc felvételein (Athens on the Szamos River, 19th Century Cluj-Napoca and Its Residents by Ferenc Veress), Kolozsvár, Művelődés, 2003 ISBN 973-7993-01-2
- Sas Péter: A 19. századi Kolozsvár és lakói Veress Ferenc felvételein (The 19th century in the recordings of Cluj-Napoca and its inhabitants by Ferenc Veress), Művelődés Kolozsvár. 2003 ISBN 978-973-7993-01-4
- Egy egyszerű, boldog leányka napjaiból: Veress Piroska naplói ("From the days of a simple, happy girl": Piroska Veress' Diaries), Sas Péter (Ed.), Kolozsvár, Művelődés Egyesület; Szentimrei Alapítvány, 2016 ISBN 978-973-7993-92-2
