= Vasyl Popovych =

Austrian clergyman (1796–1864)

- Bishop of Mukachevo
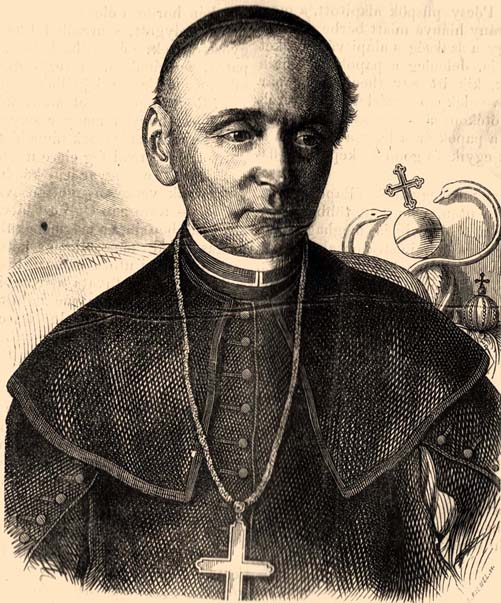
- Native name: Василь Попович
- Church: Ruthenian Greek Catholic Church
- Diocese: Eparchy of Mukachevo
- In office: 2 October 1837 – 19 October 1864
- Predecessor: Oleksiy Povchiy
- Successor: Stefan Pankovych

Orders
- Ordination: 10 April 1820 by Oleksiy Povchiy
- Consecration: 18 March 1838 by Michael Levytsky

Personal details
- Born: 12 September 1796 Velyki Komyaty, Kingdom of Hungary, Habsburg Realm
- Died: 19 October 1864 (aged 68) Ungvár, Kingdom of Hungary, Austrian Empire

Vasyl Popovych (Ukrainian: Василь Попович, Hungarian: Popovics Vazul; 12 September 1796 – 19 October 1864) was a Ruthenian Greek Catholic hierarch. He was bishop of the Ruthenian Catholic Eparchy of Mukacheve from 1837 to 1864.

Born in Velyki Komyaty, Austrian Empire (present day – Ukraine) in 1796, he was ordained a priest on 10 April 1820. He was confirmed as the Bishop by the Holy See on 2 October 1837. He was consecrated to the Episcopate on 18 March 1838. The principal consecrator was Metropolitan Mykhajlo Levitsky.

He died in Uzhhorod on 19 October 1864.

Catholic Church titles
Preceded by Oleksiy Povchiy	Ruthenian Catholic Bishop of Mukacheve; 1837–1864	Succeeded by Stefan Pankovych
