= Veľaty =

Village and municipality in Slovakia

Veľaty Velejte
- Municipality
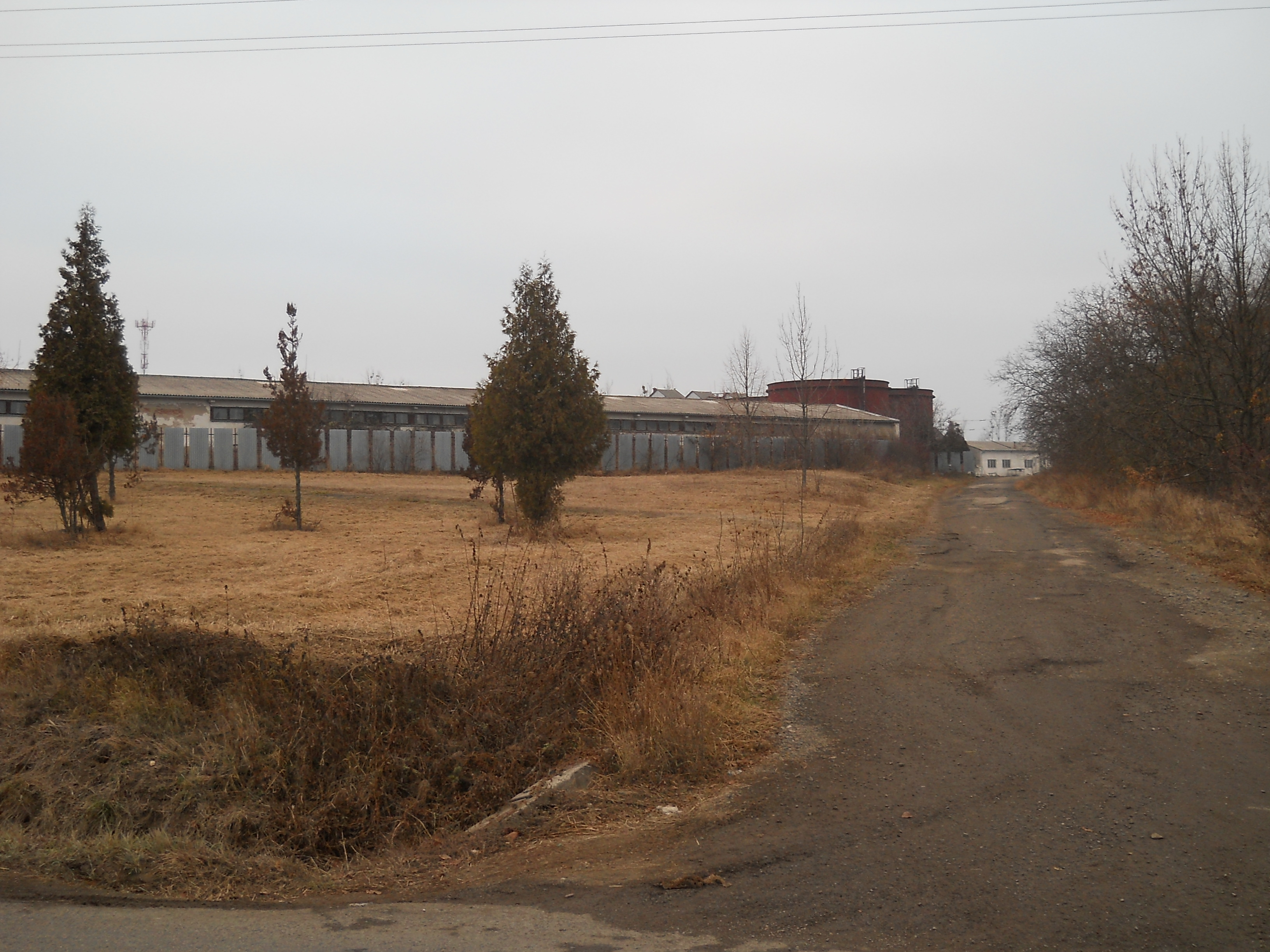

- Flag

- Location of Veľaty in the Košice Region Location of Veľaty in Slovakia
- Coordinates: 48.53°N 21.67°E
- Country: Slovakia
- Region: Košice Region
- District: Trebišov District
- First mentioned: 1220

Government
  - Mayor: Mikuláš Levkut (Hlas, Smer-SD, SME-Rodina)

Area
  - Total: 12.04 km^{2} (4.65 sq mi)
- Elevation: 141 m (463 ft)

Population (2025)
  - Total: 811
- Time zone: UTC+1 (CET)
  - Summer (DST): UTC+2 (CEST)
- Postal code: 761 5
- Area code: +421 56
- Vehicle registration plate (until 2022): TV
- Website: www.velaty.sk

Veľaty (Hungarian: Velejte) is a village and municipality in the Trebišov District in the Košice Region of south-eastern Slovakia.

== History ==
In historical records the village was first mentioned in 1280.

== Geography ==
The municipality lies at an altitude of 141 metres (463 ft) and covers an area of 12.04 km^{2} (4.65 sq mi) (2025).

== Population ==
Population statistic (10 years)
Year	1995	2005	2015	2025
Count	824	827	851	811
Difference		+0.36%	+2.90%	−4.70%

Population statistic
Year	2024	2025
Count	818	811
Difference		−0.85%

It has a population of 811 people (31 December 2025).

=== Ethnicity ===
Census 2021 (1+ %)
Ethnicity	Number	Fraction
Slovak	773	93.92%
Not found out	44	5.34%
Total	823	

In year 2021 was 823 people by ethnicity 773 as Slovak, 44 as Not found out, 6 as Romani, 5 as Czech, 4 as Hungarian, 2 as Russian, 1 as Ukrainian and 1 as Polish.

Note on population: The difference values of population numbers in the table "Population statistic" and in the sections "Ethnicity" & "Religion" is caused by the use of various statistical methods.

=== Religion ===
Census 2021 (1+ %)
Religion	Number	Fraction
Roman Catholic Church	391	47.51%
Greek Catholic Church	253	30.74%
None	75	9.11%
Not found out	64	7.78%
Jehovah's Witnesses	18	2.19%
Total	823	

In year 2021 was 823 people by religion 391 from Roman Catholic Church, 253 from Greek Catholic Church, 75 from None, 64 from Not found out, 18 from Jehovah's Witnesses, 8 from Calvinist Church, 7 from Evangelical Church, 6 from Eastern Orthodox Church and 1 from Other and not ascertained christian church.

== Facilities ==
The village has a public library and a football pitch
