= Sečovská Polianka =

- Municipality
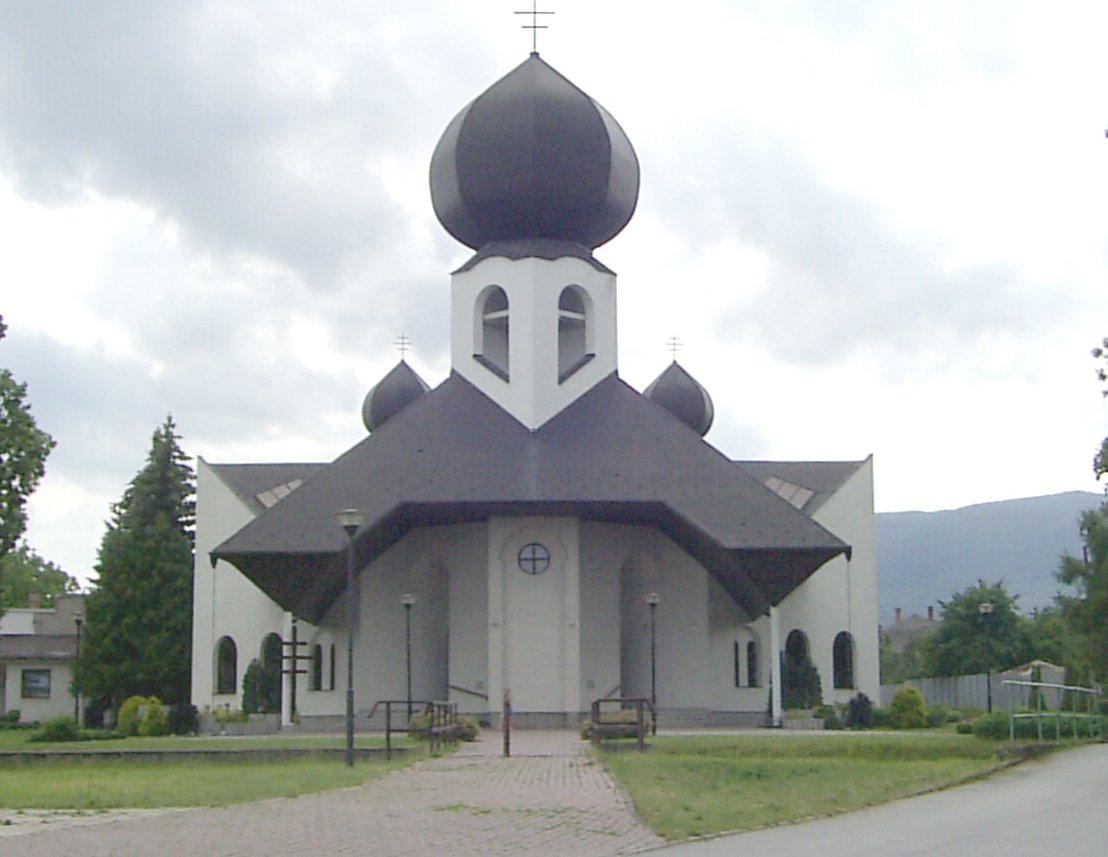

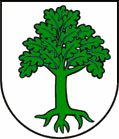
- Flag Coat of arms

- Location of Sečovská Polianka in the Prešov Region Location of Sečovská Polianka in Slovakia
- Coordinates: 48.78°N 21.70°E
- Country: Slovakia
- Region: Prešov Region
- District: Vranov nad Topľou District
- First mentioned: 1272

Area
  - Total: 22.09 km^{2} (8.53 sq mi)
- Elevation: 127 m (417 ft)

Population (2025)
  - Total: 2,594
- Time zone: UTC+1 (CET)
  - Summer (DST): UTC+2 (CEST)
- Postal code: 941 4
- Area code: +421 57
- Vehicle registration plate (until 2022): VT
- Website: secovskapolianka.sk

Sečovská Polianka (Hungarian: Szécsmező, until 1899: Szécs-Polyánka) is a village and municipality in Vranov nad Topľou District in the Prešov Region of eastern Slovakia.

== History ==
In historical records the village was first mentioned in 1272.

== Geography ==
The municipality lies at an altitude of 127 metres (417 ft) and covers an area of 22.09 km^{2} (8.53 sq mi) (2025).

== Population ==
Population statistic (10 years)
Year	1995	2005	2015	2025
Count	2560	2699	2753	2594
Difference		+5.42%	+2.00%	−5.77%

Population statistic
Year	2024	2025
Count	2619	2594
Difference		−0.95%

It has a population of 2594 people (31 December 2025).

=== Ethnicity ===
Census 2021 (1+ %)
Ethnicity	Number	Fraction
Slovak	2620	97%
Not found out	63	2.33%
Romani	49	1.81%
Total	2701	

In year 2021 was 2701 people by ethnicity 2620 as Slovak, 63 as Not found out, 49 as Romani, 12 as Rusyn, 9 as Czech, 7 as Hungarian, 4 as Russian, 2 as Ukrainian, 2 as Polish, 2 as Other, 1 as Jewish, 1 as Silesian and 1 as Canadian.

Note on population: The difference values of population numbers in the table "Population statistic" and in the sections "Ethnicity" & "Religion" is caused by the use of various statistical methods.

=== Religion ===
Census 2021 (1+ %)
Religion	Number	Fraction
Roman Catholic Church	1502	55.61%
Greek Catholic Church	971	35.95%
None	121	4.48%
Not found out	53	1.96%
Total	2701	

In year 2021 was 2701 people by religion 1502 from Roman Catholic Church, 971 from Greek Catholic Church, 121 from None, 53 from Not found out, 16 from Evangelical Church, 13 from Eastern Orthodox Church, 9 from Apostolic Church, 4 from Ad hoc movements, 3 from Calvinist Church, 3 from Christian Congregations in Slovakia, 2 from Other and not ascertained christian church, 2 from Jehovah's Witnesses, 1 from Buddhism and 1 from Bahá'i Community.
